= History of Microsoft Office =

This is a history of the various versions of Microsoft Office, consisting of a bundle of several different applications which changed over time. This table only includes final releases and not pre-release or beta software. It also does not list the history of the constituent standalone applications which were released much earlier starting with Word in 1983, Excel in 1985, and PowerPoint in 1987.

StarOffice and Microsoft Office timeline
StarOffice
OpenOffice.org
Apache OpenOffice
LibreOffice
Microsoft Office for macOS
Microsoft Office for Windows

== Office versions ==
=== Summary ===
Release date	Title	Components	Notes
October 1, 1990	The Microsoft Office for Windows	Word 1.1, Excel 2.1d, PowerPoint 2.0	
March 4, 1991	Office 1.5	Word 1.1, Excel 3.0, PowerPoint 2.0	
July 8, 1991	Office 1.6	Word 1.1, Excel 3.0, PowerPoint 2.0, Mail 2.1	Last version for Windows 3.0.
Early 1992	Office 2.0	Word 2.0a, Excel 3.0, PowerPoint 2.0, Mail 2.1	
Mid 1992	Office 2.5	Word 2.0a, Excel 4.0, PowerPoint 2.0e, Mail 2.1	Mail 2.1: licence only, no software.
August 30, 1992	Office 3.0	Word 2.0c, Excel 4.0, PowerPoint 3.0, Mail 3.0	
January 17, 1994	Office 4.0	Word 6.0, Excel 4.0, PowerPoint 3.0, Mail 3.1	
June 2, 1994	Office 4.3	Word 6.0, Excel 5.0, PowerPoint 4.0, Mail 3.2, Access 2.0	Final 16-bit version.; Last version for Windows 3.1x and Windows NT 3.1.
July 3, 1994	Office for NT 4.2	Word 6.0, Excel 5.0, PowerPoint 4.0, Office Manager	Office Manager included.; Last version for Windows NT 3.5.
August 24, 1995	Office 95 (7.0)	Word, Excel, PowerPoint, Schedule+, Binder, Access, Bookshelf	The first Office version to have the same version number (7.0, inherited from Word 6.0) for all major component products (Word, Excel and so on).; First fully 32-bit version.
November 19, 1996	Office 97 (8.0)	Word 97, Word 98, Excel, PowerPoint, Access, Publisher 97, Publisher 98, Outlook 97, Outlook 98, BookShelf Basics, Small Business Financial Manager 97, Small Business Financial Manager 98, Automap Street Plus, Direct Mail Manager, Expedia Streets 98	First version to receive extended support.; Published on CD-ROM as well as on a set of 45 3½-inch floppy disks, became Y2K-safe with Service Release 2.; Last version for Windows NT 3.51.
June 20, 1997	Office 97 Powered by Word 98 (8.5)	Word 97, Word 98, Excel, PowerPoint, Access, Publisher 97, Publisher 98, Outlook 97, Outlook 98, BookShelf Basics, Small Business Financial Manager 97, Small Business Financial Manager 98, Automap Street Plus, Direct Mail Manager, Expedia Streets 98	Word 98 was released only in Japanese and Korean editions.; First version to contain Outlook 98 in all editions and Publisher 98 in the Small Business Edition.
June 7, 1999	Office 2000 (9.0)	Word, Excel, Outlook, PowerPoint, Access, Publisher, Small Business Tools, FrontPage, PhotoDraw	First version to receive 5 years of extended support.; Second version to receive extended support.; Final version not to include Product Activation and not covered by Office Genuine Advantage, although on individual installs, the Office Update website still required the presence of original install media for updates to install.; Last version for Windows 95.
May 31, 2001	Office XP (10.0)	Word, Excel, Outlook, PowerPoint, Access, FrontPage, Publisher, Small Business Tools	Second version to receive 5 years of extended support.; Third version to receive extended support.; Improved support for working in user accounts without administrative privileges.; Last version for Windows NT 4.0, Windows 98 and Windows ME.; Final version to support 9x-based operating systems.; Also known as Office 2002.
August 19, 2003	Office 2003 (11.0)	Word, Excel, Outlook, PowerPoint, Access, Publisher, OneNote, InfoPath	Third version to receive 5 years of extended support.; Fourth version to receive extended support.; First version to only support NT-based operating systems.; Final version to use the legacy interface.; OneNote is introduced in this version.; Final version to have Arial and Times New Roman as the default fonts across all applications.; Last version for Windows 2000.
January 30, 2007	Office 2007 (12.0)	Word, Excel, PowerPoint, Outlook, Publisher, Access, Groove, OneNote, InfoPath, Communicator, Visio Viewer, OCT	Fourth version to receive 5 years of extended support.; Fifth version to receive extended support.; First version to use the Ribbon interface with tabbed menus.; First version to have Calibri as the default font across all applications.
June 15, 2010	Office 2010 (14.0)	Word, Excel, PowerPoint, OneNote, Outlook, Publisher, Access, InfoPath, SharePoint Workspace, Visio Viewer, OCT, Lync	Fifth version to receive 5 years of extended support.; Sixth version to receive extended support.; First version to ship in 32-bit and 64-bit.; Last version for Windows XP, Windows Server 2003, Windows Vista and Windows Server 2008.; Version 13.0 was skipped because of the fear of the number 13.
January 29, 2013	Office 2013 (15.0)	Word, Excel, PowerPoint, OneNote, Outlook, Publisher, Access, Lync, Skype for Business, Visio Viewer	Sixth version to receive 5 years of extended support.; Seventh version to receive extended support.; Lync is replaced with Skype for Business after an update.
September 22, 2015	Office 2016 (16.0)	Word, Excel, PowerPoint, OneNote, Outlook, Publisher, Access, Skype for Business, Visio Viewer	Final version to receive 5 years of extended support.; Eighth version to receive extended support.; Last version for Windows 7, Windows Server 2008 R2, Windows 8, Windows Server 2012, Windows 8.1, Windows Server 2012 R2 and Windows Server 2016.
September 24, 2018	Office 2019 (16.0)	Word, Excel, PowerPoint, OneNote, Outlook, Publisher, Access, Skype for Business, Visio Viewer	Final version to receive extended support.; Second perpetual release of Office 16 unlocking certain features previously limited to Office 365 customers.; OneNote was removed from the suite, and a redesigned UWP version of the app is bundled with all Windows releases instead. However, the x86 version of OneNote was added back to the suite in March 2020, as it went back into active development.
October 5, 2021	Office 2021 (16.0)	Word, Excel, PowerPoint, OneNote, Outlook, Publisher, Access, Skype for Business, Visio Viewer	First version to receive 3 years of extended support.; Final version to have Calibri as the default font across all applications.
October 1, 2024	Office 2024 (16.0)	Word, Excel, PowerPoint, OneNote, Outlook, Access, Skype for Business, Visio Viewer	First version to have Aptos as the default font across all applications.; Second version to receive 3 years of extended support.; Current release.

=== Microsoft Office 95 ===
Comparison of Office 95 editions
Application	Standard Edition	Professional Edition
Word	Yes	Yes
Excel	Yes	Yes
PowerPoint	Yes	Yes
Schedule+	Yes	Yes
Binder	Yes	Yes
Access	No	Yes
Bookshelf	No	On CD-ROM version only

=== Microsoft Office 97 ===
Comparison of Microsoft Office 97 editions
Office programs	Standard Edition	Professional Edition	Small Business Edition	Small Business Edition 2.0	Developer Edition
Word	Yes	Yes	Yes	Yes	Yes
Excel	Yes	Yes	Yes	Yes	Yes
Outlook	Yes	Yes	Yes	Yes (Note: Can be upgraded to Outlook 98 via coupon or download)	Yes
PowerPoint	Yes	Yes	No	No	Yes
Access	No	Yes	No	No	Yes
Bookshelf Basics	No	Yes	No	No	Yes
Developer Tools and SDK	No	No	No	No	Yes
Publisher 97	No	No	Yes	No	No
Small Business Financial Manager 97	No	No	Yes	No	No
Automap Streets Plus	No	No	Yes	No	No
Publisher 98	No	No	No	Yes	No
Small Business Financial Manager 98	No	No	No	Yes	No
Direct Mail Manager	No	No	No	Yes	No
Expedia Streets	No	No	No	Yes	No

=== Microsoft Office 2000 ===
Comparison of Microsoft Office 2000 editions
Office programs	Standard	Small Business	Professional	Premium	Developer
Word	Yes	Yes	Yes	Yes	Yes
Excel	Yes	Yes	Yes	Yes	Yes
Outlook	Yes	Yes	Yes	Yes	Yes
Publisher	No	Yes	Yes	Yes	Yes
Small Business Tools	No	Yes	Yes	Yes	Yes
Access	No	No	Yes	Yes	Yes
PowerPoint	Yes	No	Yes	Yes	Yes
FrontPage	No	No	No	Yes	Yes
PhotoDraw	No	No	No	Yes	Yes
Developer Tools and SDK	No	No	No	No	Yes
Visio	No	No	No	No	No
Project	No	No	No	No	No
MapPoint	No	No	No	No	No
Vizact	No	No	No	No	No

Microsoft Office 2000 Personal was an additional SKU, solely designed for the Japanese market, that included Word 2000, Excel 2000 and Outlook 2000. This compilation would later become widespread as Microsoft Office 2003 Basic.

=== Microsoft Office XP ===
Comparison of Microsoft Office XP editions
Features	Standard for Students and Teachers	Standard	Professional	Small Business	Professional with Publisher	Developer
Licensing scheme	Academic	Retail	Retail and volume	OEM	OEM	Retail, MSDN
Word 2002	Yes	Yes	Yes	Yes	Yes	Yes
Excel 2002	Yes	Yes	Yes	Yes	Yes	Yes
Outlook 2002	Yes	Yes	Yes	Yes	Yes	Yes
PowerPoint 2002	Yes	Yes	Yes	No	Yes	Yes
Access 2002	No	No	Yes	No	Yes	Yes
FrontPage 2002	No	No	No	No	No	Yes
Developer tools	No	No	No	No	No	Yes
Publisher 2002	No	No	No	Yes	Yes	No
Small Business Tools 2002	No	No	No	Yes	No	No
Visio 2002	No	No	No	No	No	No
Project 2002	No	No	No	No	No	No

=== Microsoft Office 2003 ===
Comparison of Microsoft Office 2003 editions
Application	Office Basic	Student and Teacher Edition	Standard	Small Business	Professional Edition
Word	Yes	Yes	Yes	Yes	Yes
Excel	Yes	Yes	Yes	Yes	Yes
PowerPoint	No	Yes	Yes	Yes	Yes
Outlook	Yes	Yes	Yes	Yes with Business Contact Manager	Yes with Business Contact Manager
Publisher	No	No	No	Yes	Yes
Access	No	No	No	No	Yes
InfoPath	No	No	No	No	Yes
OneNote	No	No	No	No	No
FrontPage	No	No	No	No	No
Visio	No	No	No	No	No
Project	No	No	No	No	No

=== Microsoft Office 2007 ===
Comparison of Microsoft Office 2007 editions
Programs and Features	Basic	Home and Student	Standard	Small Business	Professional	Professional Plus	Ultimate	Enterprise
Licensing scheme	OEM	OEM and retail	Retail and volume	OEM, retail, and volume	OEM and retail	Volume	Retail	Volume
Word	Yes	Yes	Yes	Yes	Yes	Yes	Yes	Yes
Excel	Yes	Yes	Yes	Yes	Yes	Yes	Yes	Yes
PowerPoint	Viewer only	Yes	Yes	Yes	Yes	Yes	Yes	Yes
OneNote	No	Yes	Yes	Yes	Yes	Yes	Yes	Yes
Outlook	Yes	No	Yes	Yes	Yes	Yes	Yes	Yes
Publisher	No	No	No	Yes	Yes	Yes	Yes	Yes
Access	No	No	No	No	Yes	Yes	Yes	Yes
Groove	No	No	No	No	No	No	Yes	Yes
InfoPath	No	No	No	No	No	Yes	Yes	Yes
Communicator	No	No	No	No	No	Yes	No	Yes
Project	No	No	No	No	No	No	No	No
SharePoint Designer	No	No	No	No	No	No	No	No
Visio	Viewer only	Viewer only	Viewer only	Viewer only	Viewer only	Viewer only	Viewer only	Viewer only
Office Customization Tool (OCT)^{1}	No	No	Volume licensing only	Volume licensing only	No	Yes	No	Yes

^{1} Office Customization Tool is used to customize the installation of Office 2007 by creating a Windows Installer patch file (.MSP) and replacing the Custom Installation Wizard and Custom Deployment Wizard included in earlier versions of the Office Resource Kit that created a Windows Installer Transform (.MST).

=== Microsoft Office 2010 ===
Comparison of Microsoft Office 2010 editions
Suites	As an individual product	Starter	Office Online	Personal^{1}	Home and Student^{2}	Home and Business^{3}	Standard	Professional^{3} Professional Academic^{4} University	Professional Plus^{5}
Licensing scheme	Varies	OEM	Free	Retail and OEM	Retail	Retail	Retail and Volume	Academic and Retail	Retail and Volume
Word	Yes	Starter edition	Basic	Yes	Yes	Yes	Yes	Yes	Yes
Excel	Yes	Starter edition	Basic	Yes	Yes	Yes	Yes	Yes	Yes
PowerPoint	Yes	Viewer (Separate)	Basic	Viewer (Separate)	Yes	Yes	Yes	Yes	Yes
OneNote	Yes	No	Basic	No	Yes	Yes	Yes	Yes	Yes
Outlook	Yes	No	No	Yes	No	Yes	Yes	Yes	Yes
Publisher	Yes	No	No	No	No	No	Yes	Yes	Yes
Access	Yes	No	No	No	No	No	No	Yes	Yes
InfoPath	Yes	No	No	No	No	No	No	No	Yes
SharePoint Workspace	Yes	No	No	No	No	No	No	No	Yes
SharePoint Designer	Yes	No	No	No	No	No	No	No	No
Project	Yes	No	No	No	No	No	No	No	No
Visio	Yes	Viewer (Separate)	No	Viewer	Viewer	Viewer	Viewer (Separate)	Viewer	Viewer
Lync	Yes	No	No	No	No	No	No	No	Volume channel only
Office Customization Tool (OCT)^{6}	No	No	No	No	No	No	Volume channel only	No	Volume channel only

Remarks
^{1} Office 2010 Personal was made available for distribution only in Japan.
^{2} The retail version of Office 2010 Home and Student can be installed on up to three machines in a single household for non-commercial use only. The Product Key Card version only allows a single installation on a single machine.
^{3} The retail versions of Office 2010 Home and Business and Office 2010 Professional can be installed on two devices including a primary machine, and a portable device such as a laptop, for use by a single user. The Product Key Card version only allows a single installation on a single machine.
^{4} On February 1, 2012, Office 2010 University replaced the previous Office 2010 Professional Academic edition in an effort to curtail fraudulent product use.
^{5} Office 2010 Professional Plus is only available for Volume License customers. The retail version is offered through MSDN or TechNet.
^{6} The Office Customization Tool is used to customize the installation of Office by creating a Windows Installer Patch (.MSP) file, and replaces the Custom Installation Wizard and Custom Deployment Wizard included in 2003 and earlier versions of the Office Resource Kit. It is only available in Volume License editions.

=== Microsoft Office 2013 ===
Comparison of Office 2013 suites
	As an individual product	Traditional editions						Office 365 subscriptions					
	As an individual product	Office RT	Home & Student	Home & Business	Standard	Professional	Professional Plus	Personal	Home	University	Small Business Premium	ProPlus	Enterprise
Availability	Varies	Windows RT	Retail, OEM	Retail, OEM	Volume licensing	Retail, OEM	Volume licensing	Software plus services	Software plus services	Software plus services	Software plus services	Software plus services	Software plus services
Maximum users	1	1	1	1	As licensed	1	As licensed	1	all users in one household	1	10	25	Unlimited
Devices per user	1	1	1	1	As licensed	1	As licensed	1 computer and 1 mobile	5 shared among all users	2 computers and 2 mobiles	5	5	5
Commercial use allowed?	Yes	Separate^{2}	No	Yes	Yes	Yes	Yes	No	No	No	Yes	Yes	Yes
Word	Yes	Yes^{1}	Yes	Yes	Yes	Yes	Yes	Yes	Yes	Yes	Yes	Yes	Yes
Excel	Yes	Yes^{1}	Yes	Yes	Yes	Yes	Yes	Yes	Yes	Yes	Yes	Yes	Yes
PowerPoint	Yes	Yes^{1}	Yes	Yes	Yes	Yes	Yes	Yes	Yes	Yes	Yes	Yes	Yes
OneNote	Yes^{3}	Yes^{1}	Yes	Yes	Yes	Yes	Yes	Yes	Yes	Yes	Yes	Yes	Yes
Outlook	Yes	Yes^{1}	No	Yes	Yes	Yes	Yes	Yes	Yes	Yes	Yes	Yes	Yes
Publisher	Yes	No	No	No	Yes	Yes	Yes	Yes	Yes	Yes	Yes	Yes	Yes
Access	Yes	No	No	No	No	Yes	Yes	Yes	Yes	Yes	Yes	Yes	Yes
InfoPath	No	No	No	No	No	No	Yes	No	No	No	No^{4}	Yes	Yes
Lync	Yes^{3}	No	No	No	No	No	Yes	No	No	No	Yes	Yes	Yes
SharePoint Designer	Yes	No	No	No	No	No	No	No	No	No	No	No	No
Project; Has multiple editions	Yes	No	No	No	No	No	No	No	No	No	No	No	No
Visio; Has multiple editions	Yes	No	Viewer	Viewer	Viewer	Viewer	Viewer	Viewer	Viewer	Viewer	Viewer	Viewer	Viewer

Remarks

^{1} The Windows RT versions do not include all of the functionality provided by other versions of Office.
^{2} Commercial use of Office RT is allowed through volume licensing or business subscriptions to Office 365.
^{3} Windows Store versions are also available.
^{4} InfoPath was initially part of Office 365 Small Business Premium. However, it no longer is.

=== Microsoft Office 2016 ===
As with previous versions, Office 2016 is made available in several distinct editions aimed towards different markets. All traditional editions of Microsoft Office 2016 contain Word, Excel, PowerPoint and OneNote and are licensed for use on one computer. The installation of retail channels of Office 2016 is Click-To-Run (C2R), however volume licensing channels Office 2016 are using traditional Microsoft Installer (MSI).

Five traditional editions of Office 2016 were released for Windows:

- Home & Student: This retail suite includes the core applications only.
- Home & Business: This retail suite includes the core applications and Outlook.
- Standard: This suite, only available through volume licensing channels, includes the core applications, as well as Outlook and Publisher.
- Professional: This retail suite includes the core applications, as well as Outlook, Publisher and Access.
- Professional Plus: This suite available through MSDN retail channels and volume licensing channels, includes the core applications, as well as Outlook, Publisher, Access and Skype for Business. The deployment of this edition has C2R for MSDN retail channels and MSI for volume licensing channels.

	Home & Student	Home & Business	Standard	Professional	Professional Plus
Core Applications	Yes	Yes	Yes	Yes	Yes
Outlook	No	Yes	Yes	Yes	Yes
Publisher	No	No	Yes	Yes	Yes
Access	No	No	No	Yes	Yes
Skype for Business	No	No	No	No	Yes

For a comparison chart for the new version of Office, Microsoft 365, click here.

Three traditional editions of Office 2016 were released for Mac:

- Home & Student: This retail suite includes the core applications only.
- Home & Business: This retail suite includes the core applications and Outlook.
- Standard: This suite, only available through volume licensing channels, includes the core applications and Outlook.

== Mac versions ==
Release date	Title	Contents	Notes
June 19, 1989	The Microsoft Office	Word 4.0, Excel 2.2, PowerPoint 2.01, Mail 1.37	
May 21, 1991	Office 1.5	Word 4.0, Excel 3.0, PowerPoint 2.01, Mail 3.0	
January 28, 1992	Office 2	Word 5.0, Excel 3.0, PowerPoint 2.01, Mail 3.0	
June, 1992	Office 2.5	Word 5.0, Excel 4.0, PowerPoint 2.01, Mail 3.0	
February, 1993	Office 3	Word 5.1, Excel 4.0, PowerPoint 3.0, Mail 3.1	
August 2, 1994	Office 4.2	Word 6, Excel 5, PowerPoint 4, Mail 3.2.	
1994	Office 4.2.1	Word 6, Excel 5, PowerPoint 4, etc.	First release designed for the PowerPC, final release for m68k.
March 25, 1998	Office 98 (8.0)	Word, Excel, PowerPoint 98	
October 11, 2000	Office 2001 (9.0	Word, Excel, Entourage and PowerPoint 2001	Final release for Mac OS 9, latest update 9.0.6.
November 19, 2001	Office v. X (10.0)	Word, Excel, Entourage and PowerPoint X	First release for Mac OS X, latest update 10.1.9.
May 11, 2004	Office 2004 (11.0)	Entourage, PowerPoint, Word, Excel 2004	Latest update 11.6.6.
January 15, 2008	Office 2008 (12.0)	Entourage, Word, PowerPoint, Excel 2008	First release that runs natively on both PowerPC and Intel x86 without the use of the Rosetta emulation layer, latest update 12.3.0. Does NOT support VBA macros.
October 26, 2010	Office 2011 (14.0)	Word, PowerPoint, Excel, Outlook 2011	First release for Intel only, latest update 14.1.2. Support for VBA re-instated to this version.
July 9, 2015	Office 2016 (16.0)	Word, Excel, PowerPoint, OneNote, Outlook 2016	Added integration with Mac capabilities such as Multi-Touch, Full Screen, and Retina optimization with a focus on cloud-connected capability.
June 12, 2018	Office 2019 (16.0)	Word, Excel, PowerPoint, OneNote, Outlook 2019	
October 5, 2021	Office 2021 (16.0)	Word, Excel, PowerPoint, OneNote, Outlook 2021	
October 1, 2024	Office 2024 (16.0)	Word, Excel, PowerPoint, OneNote, Outlook 2024	Cohesive new look across all Office applications.

=== Office 98 ===
Version	Release date
SR-1	December 12, 1998
SR-1.5	March 11, 1999
SR-1.9	June 14, 1999
SR-2	February 17, 2000
SR-2.5	September 14, 2000
SR-3	June 15, 2001
SR-4	May 17, 2002
SR-5	November 29, 2002
