= Microsoft Bookings =

Scheduling tool by Microsoft

- Screenshot Screenshot of Microsoft Bookings section Calendar
- Website type: Scheduling
- Available in: English
- Owner: Microsoft
- Website: Official Site
- Launched: US:July 20, 2016; Worldwide:July 20, 2017
- Current status: Active

Microsoft Bookings
- Developer: Microsoft Corporation
Stable release
- Android: 2.0.6 / July 2, 2019; 7 years ago
- iOS: 2.0.4 / July 9, 2019; 7 years ago
- Operating system: Android 4.4 and later, IOS 12.1 and later
- License: Proprietary commercial software
- Website: www.microsoft.com/en-us/microsoft-365/business/scheduling-and-booking-app

Microsoft Bookings is a scheduling tool and is part of the Microsoft Office family of products. Released by Microsoft in March 2017, Bookings allows customers of small businesses and companies to book appointments with the company. The application is available to Business Premium subscribers to Office 365 and offers integration with Microsoft Teams and Skype for Business, however, this feature was not available from launch.

== History ==
On July 20, 2016, Microsoft launched Bookings to customers in the U.S. and Canada with an Office 365 Business Premium license. On March 20, 2017, Microsoft globally released Bookings worldwide including launching Bookings for Android and iOS.
