= Microsoft Entourage =

Email client and personal information manager

- Entourage: Mac 2008 showing the welcome message.
- Developer: Microsoft
- Final release: 2008 (12.3.6) (March 12, 2013; 13 years ago) [±]
- Operating system: Mac OS 8.5 and later
- Type: Email client
- License: Commercial proprietary software
- Website: www.microsoft.com/france/mac/entourage2004/

Microsoft Entourage is a discontinued email client and personal information manager that was developed by Microsoft for Mac OS 8.5 and later. Microsoft first released Entourage in October 2000 as part of the Microsoft Office 2001 office suite; Office 98, the previous version of Microsoft Office for the classic Mac OS included Outlook Express 5. The last version was Entourage: Mac 2008, part of Microsoft Office 2008 for Mac, released on January 15, 2008. Entourage was replaced by Outlook for Macintosh in Microsoft Office for Mac 2011, released on October 26, 2010.

== Overview ==
My Day, a mini schedule

Entourage provided email, calendar, address book, task list, note list, and project manager functionality. With Entourage 2004, Microsoft began offering a Project Center, which allowed the user to create and organize projects. Information may come from within Entourage or outside the program. Entourage supported retrieving email using POP, IMAP, and (for Microsoft Exchange servers) WebDAV.

Entourage 2008 featured a new "My Day" utility, which assists in organizing one's day, and cites (in the welcome message) improvements to search speed, "to do" flags, improved junk mail and phishing protection, as well as quick navigation via favorites and customizable toolbars.

== Features ==
Entourage supported some Mac OS technologies, like the Spotlight search engine and AppleScript; however, the use of a monolithic database made it difficult to back up incrementally with Time Machine. Entourage also maintained a separate address book, but allowed synchronization of contacts and calendar events through Sync Services.

=== Comparison to Outlook ===
Unlike the other applications in the Mac version of the Microsoft Office suite, Entourage did not share a name with its Microsoft Windows counterpart. Microsoft claimed that Entourage was intended "to address an entirely different audience". Entourage had its origins in Outlook Express 5 on the Mac, as well as Claris Emailer and contained "no ported code, and no Office code". Nevertheless, Microsoft has positioned Entourage as a "similar" product for Macintosh customers on Exchange servers.

=== As a client for Microsoft Exchange ===
Entourage had included support for Microsoft Exchange servers since August 4, 2003, when the Exchange Update for Entourage X was released. This early release required the use of IMAP for mail connectivity and WebDAV for address and calendar functionality. (Subsequent versions have dropped the requirement for IMAP and rely solely on WebDAV.) Users complained of the lack of a variety of functions present in Outlook for Windows and Outlook 2001.

Subsequent versions of Entourage added some of the missing functionality. However, full parity with Outlook as an Exchange client was never available in Entourage 2008. Synchronization of tasks and notes with an Exchange server was not available. Many Exchange users have been vocal in denouncing Microsoft's omission of these features. Microsoft claimed to have prioritized "reliability" over expanded Exchange support in Entourage 2008.

One major shortcoming of Entourage was its inability to handle complex HTML. While messages could be received and viewed correctly, they could not be forwarded without all formatting being stripped out. As an example, an airline confirmation received from, say, Imaginary Airlines, could not be forwarded without all of the pictorial information being reduced to links, rendering the e-mail unreadable. A workaround for this was to choose "Forward as attachment" which forwarded the message as a message/rfc822 file, and preserved complex HTML formatting.

An additional limitation was the inability to attach what is referred to as an "Item" in Outlook to a message while it was being composed since there was no menu choice to allow this. Instead, a user needed to find the item to be forwarded, i.e., a Contact, select it, then choose Forward as vCard from the menu.

It was also not possible to create or manage server side rules on the Exchange server, so filtering only worked when the Entourage application was running.

=== Limitations ===
Entourage could not natively read Outlook Personal Folder files and could not read Outlook archived emails without first re-importing them back into the main Windows Outlook database. As a result, it was impossible to directly transfer email data from Outlook (Windows) into Entourage (Mac).

Although Microsoft had released a PST Import Tool for Entourage, this did not directly solve the problem of exporting data from Windows to Mac, because this utility could only import PST files from Outlook 2001 for the Mac.

One could import a Windows Outlook 2000 compatible PST to Mac Outlook 2001, and then use the utility to import into Entourage. To address this, Microsoft made Mac Outlook 2001 available for free download.

This wasn't a solution for all Mac users, because Outlook 2001 only runs in the Classic Environment, which cannot run in OS 10.5 or on any Intel Macs. Outlook for Office 2011 for Intel Macs, is able to import Outlook .pst files from Windows; however, data will be stored as many individual files, rather than in a single database such as .pst or the Entourage database.

Macworld indicates that Windows Outlook messages can be transferred to Apple Mail or Entourage by using Mozilla Thunderbird as an intermediate agent. Thunderbird on Windows is used to import the mail from Outlook. Then the converted mail file is moved from the Windows Thunderbird directory to the Mac and the import feature is used on Mac Mail or Entourage. However, message attachments will be lost in the conversion to Thunderbird.

Commercial third-party software (e.g. Emailchemy) is available to facilitate the transfer of Outlook data to Entourage. But those using the mbox format will not be able to respect any subfolder hierarchy since the mbox format doesn't support it.

Other alternative solutions include synchronizing: to an iPod Touch or iPhone through iTunes; using Apple MobileMe service; using an IMAP-enabled email provider; using a Microsoft Exchange server.

== Version history ==
- Outlook Express (Entourage's predecessor), included with Microsoft Office 98 Macintosh Edition (version 8)
- Entourage 2001, included with Microsoft Office 2001 (version 9)
- Entourage X, included with Office X (version X)
- Entourage 2004, included with Office 2004 for Mac (version 11)
- Entourage 2008, included with Office 2008 for Mac (version 12)
- Entourage 2008 Web Services Edition, separate download from Microsoft. (version 13)
- Entourage was replaced by Outlook for Macintosh in Microsoft Office for Mac 2011, released on October 26, 2010.

== See also ==
- Comparison of e-mail clients
- Comparison of office suites
- List of personal information managers
