= Microsoft Office 2000 =

Office suite by Microsoft released in 1999

- Microsoft Office 2000 core programs running with the Office Assistant present
- Developer: Microsoft
- Release: June 7, 1999; 27 years ago
- Final release: Service Pack 3 (9.0.6926) / October 21, 2002; 23 years ago
- Operating system: Windows 95 or later
- Platform: IA-32
- Predecessor: Microsoft Office 97 (1996)
- Successor: Microsoft Office XP (2001)
- Type: Office suite
- License: Proprietary commercial software
- Website: Microsoft Office 2000 (Archived at Wayback Machine)

Microsoft Office 2000 (version 9.0) is a release of Microsoft Office, an office suite developed and distributed by Microsoft for the Windows family of operating systems. Office 2000 was released to manufacturing on March 29, 1999, and was made available to retail on June 7, 1999. A Mac OS equivalent, Microsoft Office 2001, was released on October 11, 2000.

Office 2000 is compatible with Windows 95 through Windows XP and Windows Server 2003. It is the last version of Microsoft Office to run on Windows 95 and Windows NT 4.0 SP3 through SP5. Microsoft released three service packs for Office 2000 throughout its life cycle. The first update was called Service Release 1 (SR-1), while subsequent updates were referred to as service packs. Support for Office 2000 ended on July 14, 2009.

== New features ==
New features in Office 2000 include HTML document creation and publishing, Internet collaboration features such as integration with NetMeeting, roaming user profile support, COM add-in support; an updated version of the Office Assistant that utilizes Microsoft Agent, improved compliance with the year 2000, and interface improvements including personalized menus and toolbars that omit infrequently used commands from view. Office 2000 introduces PhotoDraw, a raster and vector imaging program, as well as Web Components. It is also the first version of Office to use Windows Installer for the installation process. It also comes with Internet Explorer 5 and uses its technologies as well.

All retail editions sold in Australia, Brazil, China, France, and New Zealand, as well as academic copies sold in Canada and the United States, required the user to activate the product via the Internet. Microsoft extended this requirement to retail editions sold in Canada and the United States with the availability of Office 2000 Service Release 1. However, unlike in later versions, this was a temporary requirement as both mandatory activation and voluntary registration are automatically disabled in all editions as of April 15, 2003. Product activation would become a permanent requirement for all editions of Office from Office XP onward.

== Editions ==
Microsoft released five main editions of Office 2000 globally: Standard, Small Business, Professional, Premium, and Developer. An additional Personal edition with Word, Excel, and Outlook exclusive to Japan was also released. A similar Basic edition would later be released for Office 2003 to all markets.

MapPoint, Project, Visio and Vizact also used the Microsoft Office 2000 brand, but they were only available as standalone programs.

| Office programs | Standard | Small Business | Professional | Premium | Developer | Personal (Note: Japan exclusive) |
|---|---|---|---|---|---|---|
| Word | Yes | Yes | Yes | Yes | Yes | Yes |
| Excel | Yes | Yes | Yes | Yes | Yes | Yes |
| Outlook | Yes | Yes | Yes | Yes | Yes | Yes |
| PowerPoint | Yes | No | Yes | Yes | Yes | No |
| Binder | Yes | No | Yes | Yes | Yes | No |
| Publisher | No | Yes | Yes | Yes | Yes | No |
| Small Business Tools (Note: Includes Small Business Customer Manager, Business Planner, Direct Mail Manager and Small Business Financial Manager) | No | Yes | Yes | Yes | Yes | No |
| Access | No | No | Yes | Yes | Yes | No |
| FrontPage | No | No | No | Yes | Yes | No |
| PhotoDraw (Note: Office 2000 SR-1 Premium retail version includes PhotoDraw v2) | No | No | No | Yes | Yes | No |
| Developer Tools and SDK | No | No | No | No | Yes | No |
| MapPoint | No | No | No | No | No | No |
| Project | No | No | No | No | No | No |
| Visio | No | No | No | No | No | No |
| Vizact | No | No | No | No | No | No |

== System requirements ==
Office 2000 system requirements
| Requirement | Minimum | Recommended |
Microsoft Windows
| Operating system | Windows 95 or later | |
| CPU | Intel Pentium 75 MHz; Intel Pentium 166 MHz or higher required for PhotoDraw | |
| Memory | 16 MB (9x); 32 MB (NT); An additional 4 MB is required per each Office app running simultaneously (8 MB for Access, FrontPage, or Outlook; 16 MB for PhotoDraw) | |
| Free space | 189 MB (Standard); 360 MB (Small Business); 391 MB (Professional); 526 MB (Premium); 871 MB (Developer) | |
| Media | A CD-ROM drive or compatible DVD-ROM drive is required to install Office 2000 from optical media | |
| Graphics hardware | 640x480 (VGA) | 800×600 (SVGA) with 256 colors |
| Sound hardware | An audio output device is required for multimedia effects | |
| Network | Certain advanced collaboration functionality in Outlook requires Exchange Server; Internet access is required for online functionality | |
| Input device(s) | Mouse and keyboard | |
