= Microsoft Office 97 =

1997 software package

- Microsoft Office 97 applications (Word, Excel, PowerPoint, Outlook) running with the Office Assistant present
- Developer: Microsoft
- Release: November 19, 1996; 29 years ago
- Final release: Service Release 2B (8.0.5903) / October 7, 1999; 26 years ago
- Operating system: Windows NT 3.51 SP5 or later
- Platform: IA-32, DEC Alpha (partial)
- Predecessor: Microsoft Office 95 (1995)
- Successor: Microsoft Office 2000 (1999)
- Type: Office suite
- License: Proprietary commercial software
- Website: Microsoft Office 97 (Archived at Wayback Machine)

Microsoft Office 97 (version 8.0) is the fifth major release for Windows of Microsoft Office, released by Microsoft on November 19, 1996. A Mac OS equivalent, Microsoft Office 98 Macintosh Edition, was released on January 6, 1998. Microsoft Office 97 became a major milestone release for introducing new features and improvements over its predecessor Microsoft Office 95.

The suite is officially compatible with Windows NT 3.51 SP5 through Windows Me. (Note: Outlook, FrontPage and Publisher 98 require Windows NT 4.0) It is the last version of Microsoft Office to support Windows NT 3.51 SP5 and Windows NT 4.0 RTM–SP2. Two Service Releases (SR-1 and SR-2) have been released for Office 97; SR-2 solves the year 2000 problem in Office 97. Hotfix support for Office 97 ended on February 28, 2002, while assisted support options and security updates ended on January 16, 2004.

== Features ==
Office 97 introduced "Command Bars", a paradigm in which menus and toolbars are made more similar in capability and visual design. It also featured natural language systems and sophisticated grammar checking.

Office 97 introduced the Office Assistant, an interactive animated character designed to assist users via Office help content. The default assistant is "Clippit", nicknamed "Clippy", a paperclip.

Office 97 is the first Microsoft product to include product activation, albeit limited to the Brazilian editions of Office 97 Small Business Edition and Publisher.

An option to upgrade to Internet Explorer 3.02 came with the Office Professional version, though the icon would not appear if the browser was already installed.

Three Office 97 applications feature easter eggs: a hidden pinball game in Microsoft Word, a hidden flight simulator in Microsoft Excel and a secret developer credits screen in Microsoft Word. The latter went undocumented for 29 years.

Office 97 supported UTF-16.

== Editions ==
The vivid cover art emphasized the fifth "puzzle piece", Microsoft Access.

Office 97 has been released in five editions: Standard Edition, Professional Edition, Small Business Edition, Small Business Edition 2.0, and Developer Edition. Each has its own selection of included applications.

Office programs	Standard Edition	Professional Edition	Small Business Edition	Small Business Edition 2.0	Developer Edition
Word	Yes	Yes	Yes	Yes (Note: Includes SR-1 update)	Yes
Excel	Yes	Yes	Yes	Yes	Yes
Outlook	Yes	Yes	Yes	Yes (Note: Can be upgraded to Outlook 98 via coupon or download, although several OEM copies included Outlook 98)	Yes
PowerPoint	Yes	Yes	No	No	Yes
Access	No	Yes	No	No	Yes
Bookshelf Basics	No	Yes	No	No	Yes
Developer Tools and SDK	No	No	No	No	Yes
Publisher 97	No	No	Yes	No	No
Small Business Financial Manager 97	No	No	Yes (Note: Can be upgraded to Small Business Financial Manager 98 for free from Office Update website (requires Excel 97 SR-1); available in the United States, Canada, United Kingdom and Australia)	No	No
Automap Streets Plus 5.0	No	No	Yes (Note: Available only in the United States and Canada)	No	No
Publisher 98	No	No	No	Yes	No
Small Business Financial Manager 98	No	No	No	Yes (Note: Available in the United States, Canada, United Kingdom and Australia)	No
Direct Mail Manager	No	No	No	Yes (Note: Available only in the United States)	No
Expedia Streets	No	No	No	Yes	No
Internet Explorer 3	Yes	Yes	Yes	No	Yes
Internet Explorer 4	No	No	No	Yes	No
Schedule+	Yes	Yes	No	No	Yes
Binder	Yes	Yes	No	No	Yes
FrontPage	No	No	No	No	No
Project	No	No	No	No	No
Team Manager	No	No	No	No	No
