= Office Genuine Advantage =

Program by Microsoft

- Developer: Microsoft
- Stable release: 2.0.48.0 / August 3, 2009; 17 years ago
- Operating system: Microsoft Windows
- Platform: Microsoft Windows: Office XP, Office 2003, Office 2007. Mac OS X: Office X, Office 2004, Office 2008
- Type: Software validation
- License: Proprietary software
- Website: www.microsoft.com/genuine/

Office Genuine Advantage (OGA) was a program by Microsoft, similar to Windows Genuine Advantage (WGA), which required users of the Microsoft Office software to validate their copy of Microsoft Office to download non-critical updates and other downloads such as addons and samples.

This is different from Microsoft Product Activation in that activation is required to use the software and is enforced at the software level, whereas validation permits users to download files and updates from the Microsoft web site and is Internet-based. Validation rejects those product keys that have either been leaked widely or those key-generated to pass through activation but not validation.

Starting October 27, 2006, users of Office Update were required to validate the legitimacy of their Office software in order to download files and updates.

On April 15, 2008, Microsoft released Office Genuine Advantage Notifications to Windows Server Update Services as KB949810.

On December 17, 2010, Microsoft retired Office Genuine Advantage. The Office Genuine Advantage article on Microsoft support website was updated to reflect this.
