= Microsoft Office 2001 =

Suite of productivity software by Microsoft

- Office 2001 featured unique packaging, both for individual software (excluding Entourage) and the entire suite.
- Developer: Microsoft
- Release: August 2000; 25 years ago
- Final release: 9.0.6 / July 25, 2005; 20 years ago
- Operating system: Classic Mac OS
- Predecessor: Microsoft Office 98 Macintosh Edition
- Successor: Microsoft Office v. X
- Type: Office suite

System requirements
- CPU: PowerPC (120MHz or faster recommended)
- Operating system: Mac OS 8.1 through 9.2.2; Mac OS X 10.0 through 10.4.11 using the Classic Environment
- RAM: 32 MB on OS 8; 48 MB on OS 9; 1 MB virtual memory required
- Free hard disk space: 75 MB (160 MB for drag-and-drop)
- Optical drive: CD-ROM (for local installation)

Microsoft Office 2001 is a suite of productivity software for Mac OS 8, Mac OS 9, or the Classic environment in Mac OS X. It is the Mac equivalent of Office 2000. It was developed by Microsoft and announced on September 13, 2000 before its release on October 11, 2000.

== Applications ==
As with previous versions of Microsoft Office, Office 2001 includes Word, PowerPoint, and Excel. It also includes, for the first time, Entourage, a personal information manager that features an e-mail client, a calendar, an address book, task lists and personal notes.

== New features ==
=== Word ===
Dictionary
The dictionary gives definitions for words in a document. This is different from previous versions of the dictionary which only gave the spelling of words.
Word count
A live word count is included which automatically displays the number of words written as they are typed. This is in contrast with previous version of Word in which Word Count had to be manually selected from a menu.
Click and type
Microsoft Office 2001 made it possible to double-click anywhere on the page and begin typing there. In previous versions of Word, the only way to begin typing in the middle of a blank line would be to press tab or space button until the cursor arrived at the desired location.

=== PowerPoint ===
Bullet points and numbering
Bullet points in PowerPoint presentations can now be more than just dots. There are several small graphics to choose from to replace the standard bullet point. Also, numbered lists can now enumerate themselves even if they are rearranged into a different order or extra items are added.
QuickTime
With Office 2001 it is possible to save PowerPoint presentations in QuickTime File Format. A QuickTime slideshow works just like an ordinary slideshow and can be opened and edited in PowerPoint.

=== Excel ===
List manager
The list manager and list wizard automate tasks that involve sorting and summarizing list data.

Formula calculator
This virtual calculator provides a simple way to create formulas for cells throughout the Excel spreadsheet.

Autocomplete
Excel can predict a word or phrase that the user wants to type in without the user actually typing it in completely.

Other improvements

- Euro can now be used as a currency
- Font menu shows each font in their respective font
- Highlighting colored cells no longer inverts the color

=== Entourage ===
Office 2001 was the first time Entourage was released. It features a calendar, to-do list, email and address book all into one. Entourage also lets users transfer all of their information from these features onto corresponding applications on a Palm device.

=== Value Pack ===
The Microsoft Office 2001 for Mac Value Pack contains several features that give Microsoft Office 2001 more functionality. All of these optional are available for install straight from the Office 2001 CD.

Assistants
By default there is already an Office Assistant installed with Microsoft Office 2001. With the Value Pack there are many more selectable office assistants available. Users are then able select an Office Assistant that matches their personality and the way in which they work.

Clip art
Additional clip art files, GIFs, background textures, and movies can be installed with the Value Pack. These new visuals can be added to Microsoft Office documents as well as presentations and are accessible through the Microsoft Office 2001: Clip Art Folder.

Equation Editor
Equation Editor allows for mathematical equations to be included in Excel, Word and PowerPoint. Mathematical symbols appear in a toolbar at the top of the screen and the user can combine these along with numbers and/or variables to create complex equations and mathematical statements.

Set Language add-in
Set Language add-In was a feature that only affected Excel. This new feature allowed users to check for correct grammar and spelling with more than one language at a time.

Genigraphics Wizard
Makes it possible to have PowerPoint presentations made into real slides, or transparencies, among other printed media. This wizard facilitates the process of sending PowerPoint presentations to Genigraphics who will create the product that you want.

Microsoft Query
Collects data from outside sources and brings it together in an Excel document. This is meant to save time that would otherwise be spent manually copying data over from one place to another by having it automatically be analyzed in Excel. It is also possible to set up Query so that if the original source of data is updated, the Excel document will also be updated accordingly. However, to take full advantage of this new feature, the download of separate ODBC drivers is required because Query can not access the outside source's data without them.

Microsoft Works 4.0 converter
This converter allows Microsoft Works 4.0 word-processing documents to be opened using Microsoft Word.

Proofing tools
Value Pack also includes proofing tools for different languages that are not included in the original install if 'Easy Install' was chosen during the original installation process. These optional proofing tools include hyphenation, dictionary and thesaurus files for the following languages: Danish, Dutch, French, German, Italian, Japanese, Norwegian, Spanish and Swedish.

Templates
Several new templates are included in the Value Pack for Word, Excel and PowerPoint. This added variety of templates makes it easier to create a good-looking document or presentation without as much effort as creating a template from scratch.

Unbinder
Binders are groups of files that could be created using Microsoft Office on a Windows PC. However, these Binders could not be edited using a Macintosh computer which is why the Unbinder is needed. With the Unbinder, the Binders could be taken apart and the files could be worked on separately.

Word 97-2001 converter
The Microsoft 97-2001 Converter made it possible for users of Microsoft Word 6.0 to open documents that were made in newer versions of Microsoft Word. Before this, Word could only open documents that were in an equal or older format. This converter makes it possible to open and edit files created using Microsoft Word 98 or later on a Mac with only Word 6.0 installed.

Word Perfect 5 converter
The Word Perfect 5 Converter allows for users to use Microsoft Word 2001 to open and save WordPerfect 5.0 and 5.1 files which is something that was not previously possible.

== Updates ==
On October 12, 2004 Microsoft published the Microsoft Office 2001 for Mac Security Update (9.0.5). This update addresses security and stability issues with Microsoft Word, PowerPoint, Excel, and Entourage. The download is offered both as a .bin file and as a .hqx file.

Microsoft Office 2001 for Mac Security Update (9.0.6) was released on July 20, 2005. Microsoft's description of this downloadable update says that it "addresses several buffer overrun vulnerabilities in all Microsoft Office 2001 programs." This update also fixes a problem that was occurring which affected the use of Japanese characters in Microsoft Excel. Once again this update was offered in the form of two different file types, .bin and .hqx.

On January 1, 2001 Microsoft released a document highlighting keyboard shortcuts specifically for Microsoft Excel 2001.

Support for Office 2001 ended on December 31, 2005. As Classic Macintosh software, Office 2001 will not run on Mac OS X Leopard or later versions of macOS.

== Bugs ==
Occasionally Office 2001 will report a "disk is full" error while saving a Word document, even if the hard drive is not actually full. This is caused by saving a document too frequently and the computer running out of the temporary space needed to save the file. The problem can be solved by restarting Word or restarting the Mac altogether.

== Reception ==
When Steve Jobs announced Office 2001 at the Apple Paris Expo on September 13, 2000, the crowd booed in a manner similar to how Internet Explorer for Mac was booed. Jobs reassured the crowd by saying: "Isn't it great that the Mac is going to have the best version of Office?" The software was then demonstrated by Kevin Browne, the general manager of the Mac BU at the time, in a French user interface. Entourage 2001 was the first program shown, to which the crowd applauded upon hearing that it along with its unique features were only available for the Mac. Word 2001 and PowerPoint 2001 were also demonstrated to positive crowd reactions. Excel 2001 was not demonstrated.
