= Microsoft Office for Mac 2011 =

Version of Microsoft Office for Mac released in 2011

- Microsoft Office for Mac 2011 applications shown on Mac OS X Snow Leopard
- Developer: Microsoft
- Release: October 26, 2010; 15 years ago
- Final release: 14.7.7 / September 7, 2017; 9 years ago
- Operating system: Mac OS X 10.5.8 to macOS 10.14.6
- Predecessor: Microsoft Office 2008 for Mac
- Successor: Microsoft Office 2016
- Type: Office suite
- License: Commercial proprietary software
- Website: www.microsoft.com/mac/

Microsoft Office for Mac 2011 is a version of the Microsoft Office productivity suite for macOS. It is the successor to Microsoft Office 2008 for Mac and is comparable to Office 2010 for Windows. Office 2011 was followed by Microsoft Office 2016 for Mac released on July 9, 2015, requiring a Mac with an x64 Intel processor and OS X Yosemite or later. Office for Mac 2011 is no longer supported as of October 10, 2017. Support for Lync for Mac 2011 ended on October 9, 2018.

== New features ==
Microsoft Office 2011 includes more robust enterprise support and greater feature parity with the Windows edition. Its interface is now more similar to Office 2007 and 2010 for Windows, with the addition of the ribbon. Support for Visual Basic for Applications macros has returned after having been dropped in Office 2008. Purchasing the Home Premium version of Office for Mac will not allow telephone support automatically to query any problems with the VBA interface. There are however, apparently, according to Microsoft Helpdesk, some third party applications that can address problems with the VBA interface with Office for Mac. In addition, Office 2011 supports online collaboration tools such as OneDrive and Office Web Apps, allowing Mac and Windows users to simultaneously edit documents over the web. It also includes limited support for Apple's high-density Retina Displays, allowing the display of sharp text and images, although most icons within applications themselves are not optimized for this.

A new version of Microsoft Outlook, written using Mac OS X's Cocoa API, returns to the Mac for the first time since 2001 and has full support for Microsoft Exchange Server 2007. It replaces Entourage, which was included in Office 2001, X, 2004 and 2008 for Mac.

== Limitations ==
Office for Mac 2011 has several limitations compared to Office 2010 for Windows. It does not support ActiveX controls, or OpenDocument Format. It also cannot handle attachments in Rich Text Format e-mail messages sent from Outlook for Windows, which are delivered as winmail.dat attachments. It also has several human language limitations, such as lack of support for right-to-left languages such as Arabic, Persian, and Hebrew and automatic language detection.

Microsoft does not support CalDAV and CardDAV in Outlook, so there is no way to sync directly Outlook through iCloud. Outlook also does not allow the user to disable Cached Exchange Mode, unlike the Windows version, and it is therefore not possible to connect to an Exchange Server without downloading a local cache of mail and calendar data.

Office for Mac 2011 also has a shorter lifecycle than Office 2010. Support for Office for Mac 2011 was originally scheduled to end on January 12, 2016, but because Office for Mac 2016 did not come out until July 2015, Microsoft extended support until October 10, 2017. As 32-bit software, it will not run on macOS Catalina or later versions of macOS. It is also not officially supported on macOS High Sierra and macOS Mojave.

== Editions ==
Two editions are available to the general public. Home & Student provides Word, Excel and PowerPoint, while Home & Business adds Outlook and increased support. Microsoft Messenger 8 is included with both editions, and Microsoft Communicator for Mac 2011, which communicates with Microsoft Lync Server, is available only to volume licensing customers. Office 2011 requires an Intel Mac running Mac OS X 10.5.8 or later.

Comparison of editions
| Applications and services | Home & Student | Home & Business | Academic | Standard |
|---|---|---|---|---|
| Word | Included | Included | Included | Included |
| PowerPoint | Included | Included | Included | Included |
| Excel | Included | Included | Included | Included |
| Outlook | Not included | Included | Included | Included |
| Communicator or Lync | Not included | Not included | Included | Included |
| Office Web Apps | Included | Included | Included | Included |
| Remote Desktop Connection | Not included | Included | Included | Included |
| Information Rights Management | Included | Included | Included | Included |
| Windows SharePoint Services Support | Not included | Included | Included | Included |
| Technical support | 90 days | 1 year | 90 days | ? |

The Home & Student edition is available in a single license for one computer and a family pack for three computers. The Home & Business edition is available in a single license for one computer and a multi-pack for two computers. The Standard edition is only available through Volume Licensing. The Academic edition was created for higher education students, staff and faculty, and includes one installation. Office for Mac is also available as part of Microsoft's Office 365 subscription programme.

== Development ==
Microsoft announced Office 2011 in 2009. There were 6 beta versions released:

- Beta 1
- Beta 2 (Version 14.0.0, Build 100326)
- Beta 3 (Build 100519)—announced on May 25, 2010
- Beta 4 (Build 100526)
- Beta 5 (Build 100709)
- Beta 6 (Build 100802)

Access to beta versions was by invitation only, although leaked copies were circulated among Mac file sharing websites.

The final version was released to manufacturing on September 10, 2010, was available to volume license customers a day later, and made available to the general public on October 26, 2010. Service Pack 1 was released on April 12, 2011.

== See also ==
- Comparison of office suites
