= Microsoft Office 2016 =

Version of Microsoft Office, a productivity suite

- Clockwise from top left: Word, Excel, Outlook and PowerPoint
- Developer: Microsoft
- Release: September 22, 2015; 11 years ago

Stable release(s) [±]
- Retail: 2509 (Build 19231.20194) / October 14, 2025; 13 months ago
- Volume licensed: September 2026 PU / September 8, 2026; 2 months ago
- Operating system: Windows 7 SP1 or later Windows Server 2008 R2 SP1 or later
- Platform: IA-32, x64
- Predecessor: Microsoft Office 2013 (2013)
- Successor: Microsoft Office 2019 (2018)
- Available in: 102 languages
- List of languages: Full (40): Arabic, Bulgarian, Chinese (Simplified), Chinese (Traditional), Croatian, Czech, Danish, Dutch, English, Estonian, Finnish, French, German, Greek, Hebrew, Hindi, Hungarian, Indonesian, Italian, Japanese, Kazakh, Korean, Latvian, Lithuanian, Malay (Latin), Norwegian Bokmål, Polish, Portuguese (Brazil), Portuguese (Portugal), Romanian, Russian, Serbian (Latin, Serbia), Slovak, Slovenian, Spanish, Swedish, Thai, Turkish, Ukrainian, Vietnamese; Partial (51): Afrikaans, Albanian, Amharic, Armenian, Assamese, Azerbaijani (Latin), Bangla (Bangladesh), Bangla (Bengali India), Basque (Basque), Belarusian, Bosnian (Latin), Catalan, Dari, Filipino, Galician, Georgian, Gujarati, Icelandic, Irish, Kannada, Khmer, KiSwahili, Konkani, Kyrgyz, Luxembourgish, Macedonian (FYROM Macedonia), Malayalam, Maltese, Maori, Marathi, Mongolian (Cyrillic), Nepali, Norwegian Nynorsk, Odia, Persian (Farsi), Punjabi (Gurmukhi), Quechua, Scottish Gaelic, Serbian (Cyrillic, Bosnia & Herzegovina), Serbian (Cyrillic, Serbia), Sindhi (Arabic), Sinhala, Tamil, Tatar (Cyrillic), Telugu, Turkmen (Latin), Urdu, Uyghur, Uzbek (Latin), Valencian, Welsh; Proofing only (11): Hausa, Igbo, isiXhosa, isiZulu, Kinyarwanda, Pashto, Romansh, Sesotho sa Leboa, Setswana, Wolof, Yoruba
- Type: Office suite
- License: Trialware; OneNote 2016: Freemium

Microsoft Office 2016 for Mac
- Clockwise from top left: Word, Excel, Outlook and PowerPoint
- Developer: Microsoft
- Release: July 9, 2015; 11 years ago
- Stable release: 16.16.27 (20101200) (October 13, 2020; 6 years ago) [±]
- Operating system: OS X Yosemite or later
- Platform: x64
- Predecessor: Microsoft Office 2011
- Successor: Microsoft Office 2019
- Available in: 27 languages
- List of languages English, Arabic, Chinese (Simplified), Chinese (Traditional), Czech, Danish, Dutch, Finnish, French, German, Greek, Hebrew, Hungarian, Indonesian, Italian, Japanese, Korean, Norwegian (Bokmål), Polish, Portuguese (Portugal), Portuguese (Brazil), Russian, Slovak, Spanish, Swedish, Thai, Turkish

Microsoft Office 2016 (codenamed Office 16) is a version of the Microsoft Office productivity suite, succeeding both Office 2013 and Office for Mac 2011 and preceding Office 2019 for both platforms. It was released on macOS on July 9, 2015, and on Microsoft Windows on September 22, 2015, for Office 365 subscribers. Mainstream support ended on October 13, 2020, and extended support for most editions of Office 2016 ended on October 14, 2025. The perpetually licensed version on macOS and Windows was released on September 22, 2015. Office 2016 is compatible with Windows 7 SP1 and Windows Server 2008 R2 SP1 through Windows 11 v23H2 and Windows Server 2022. It is also compatible with OS X Yosemite through macOS Sequoia. It is the last version of Microsoft Office to run on Windows 7 SP1, Windows Server 2008 R2 SP1, Windows 8, Windows Server 2012, Windows 8.1, Windows Server 2012 R2, Windows 10 RTM through v1803 and Windows Server 2016.

== New features ==
=== Windows ===
New features in the Windows release include the ability to create, open, edit, save, and share files in the cloud straight from the desktop, a new search tool for commands available in Word, PowerPoint, Excel, Outlook, Access, Visio and Project named "Tell Me", more "Send As" options in Word and PowerPoint, and co-authoring in real time with users connected to Office Online. Other smaller features include insights, a feature powered by Bing to provide contextual information from the web, a Designer sidebar in PowerPoint to optimize the layout of slides, more new chart types and templates in Excel (such as treemap, sunburst chart (also known as a ring chart), waterfall chart, box plot and histogram, and financial and calendar templates), new animations in PowerPoint (such as the Morph transition), the ability to insert online video in OneNote, enhanced support for attachments for emails in Outlook (supporting both locally-stored files and files on OneDrive or SharePoint), a Groups feature for Outlook, and a data loss prevention feature in Word, Excel, and PowerPoint.

Microsoft Office 2016 is the first in the series to support the vector graphic format SVG.

Microsoft Office 2016 cannot coexist with Microsoft Office 2013 apps if both editions use Click-To-Run installer, but it can coexist with earlier versions of Microsoft Office since they use Windows Installer (MSI) technology. Microsoft requires that any 2013 versions be uninstalled, which it will offer to do automatically, before the 2016 versions can be installed.

Despite not supporting Windows XP anymore, tooltips for various ribbon items (e.g. Paragraph, Font, Footnotes or Page Setup) still show screenshots of Office on Windows XP.

=== Mac ===
New features in the Mac release include an updated user interface that uses ribbons, full support for Retina Display, and new sharing features for Office documents.

In Word, there is a new Design tab, an Insights feature, which is powered by Bing, and real-time co-authoring. In Excel, there is a Recommended Charts feature, and PivotTable Slicers. In PowerPoint, there are theme variants, which provide different color schemes for a theme. In Outlook, there is a Propose New Time feature, the ability to see calendars side by side, and a weather forecast in the calendar view.

Outlook 2016 for Mac has very limited support for synchronization of collaboration services outside basic email.

With version 15.25, Office for Mac transitioned from 32-bit to 64-bit by default. Users that require a 32-bit version for compatibility reasons will be able to download the 15.25 version as a manual, one-time update from the Microsoft Office website. All versions following 15.25 will be 64-bit only. Office for Mac received Touch Bar support in an update on February 16, 2017, following the launch of the 2016 MacBook Pro models. 32-bit versions of Office for Mac will not run on macOS Catalina; therefore, version 15.25 is the earliest version of Office for Mac that will run on the latest version of macOS.

Support ended for this version on October 13, 2020 as Office for Mac doesn't have extended support unlike its Windows counterparts.

== Removed features ==
In Office 2016 for Windows, a number of features were removed:

- Clip Art, and clip art offered through Office.com was removed. Images can instead be downloaded from Bing Images.
- Support for EPS images was removed for security reasons.
- The Document Information Panel was removed.
- Support for Exchange Server 2007 was removed from Outlook.
- Outlook Social Connector no longer works.
- PowerPoint can no longer open HTML files.
- Word can no longer publish blog posts to Blogger.

== Editions ==
=== Traditional editions ===
As with previous versions, Office 2016 is made available in several distinct editions aimed towards different markets. All traditional editions of Microsoft Office 2016 contain Word, Excel, PowerPoint and OneNote and are licensed for use on one computer.

Five traditional editions of Office 2016 were released for Windows:

- Home & Student: This retail suite includes the core applications only - Word, Excel, PowerPoint, OneNote.
- Home & Business: This retail suite includes the core applications and Outlook.
- Standard: This suite, only available through volume licensing channels, includes the core applications, as well as Outlook and Publisher.
- Professional: This retail suite includes the core applications, as well as Outlook, Publisher, and Access.
- Professional Plus: This suite available through Retail and Volume Licensing channel, includes the core applications, as well as Outlook, Publisher, Access, and Skype for Business.

Application(s)	Home & Student	Home & Business	Standard	Professional	Professional Plus
Core applications	Yes	Yes	Yes	Yes	Yes
Outlook	No	Yes	Yes	Yes	Yes
Publisher	No	No	Yes	Yes	Yes
Access	No	No	No	Yes	Yes
Skype for Business	No	No	No	No	Yes

Retail versions of Office 2016 for Windows use the Click-to-Run installer. Volume-licensed versions of Office 2016 use Windows Installer (MSI) technology. Some editions like Professional Plus are available in both retail (C2R) and volume (MSI) channels.

Three traditional editions of Office 2016 were released for Mac:

- Home & Student: This retail suite includes the core applications only.
- Home & Business: This retail suite includes the core applications and Outlook.
- Standard: This suite, only available through volume licensing channels, includes the core applications and Outlook.

=== Office 365 ===
The Office 365 subscription services, which were previously aimed towards business and enterprise users, were expanded for Office 2016 to include new plans aimed at home use. The subscriptions allow use of the Office 2016 applications by multiple users using a software as a service model. Different plans are available for Office 365, some of which also include value-added services, such as 1 TB of OneDrive storage and 60 Skype minutes per month on the Home Premium plan.

== Design ==
The user interface design of Office 2016 for Windows is relatively unchanged from its predecessor, Microsoft Office 2013. It retains the flat design that was introduced along with the Metro design language, albeit with a few modifications to the layout, in order to conform with the design of Microsoft Office Mobile. When Office 2016 was released, it came with three themes. The default theme, known as "colorful", features a solid color on the top band of the ribbon, corresponding to the color of the Office application being used, for example, a solid dark blue is featured prominently in Microsoft Word. The theme had been described as useful in making the tab headings more distinct. In addition, both the "white" and "dark grey" themes from Office 2013 are available as well, though no new backgrounds have been added, nor have any existing backgrounds been removed. A fourth "black" theme was added as part of an update in January 2016. The update was not released to users of the traditional editions. However, all the 365 feature updates like the mentioned fourth "black" theme are bundled and included in the perpetual release of Office 2019.

== Criticism ==
On November 13, 2018, a report initiated by the Government of the Netherlands showed that Microsoft Office 2016 and Office 365 do not comply with the GDPR, the European statute on privacy.

OneNote 2016 and Publisher 2016 do not include the Tell Me search feature that was added to all other Office apps. In response to feedback, Microsoft later added the Tell Me box to the Universal Windows Platform (UWP) version of OneNote.

== See also ==
- List of office suites
