= Microsoft Office 2008 for Mac =

Productivity software

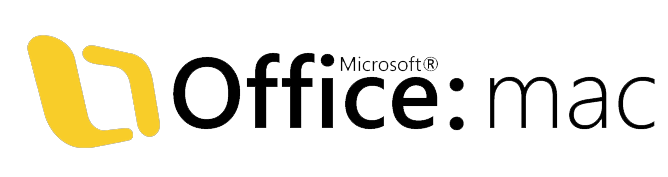

- Microsoft Office 2008 for Mac applications: Word, Excel, PowerPoint and Entourage on Mac OS X 10.5 Leopard
- Developer: Microsoft
- Release: January 15, 2008; 18 years ago
- Stable release: 12.3.6 / March 12, 2013; 13 years ago
- Operating system: Mac OS X 10.4.9 through macOS 10.14.6
- Predecessor: Microsoft Office 2004 for Mac
- Successor: Microsoft Office for Mac 2011
- Type: Office suite
- License: Commercial proprietary software
- Website: www.microsoft.com/mac/products/Office2008/default.mspx

System requirements
- CPU: PowerPC G4 or G5 (500 MHz or faster) or any Intel processor
- Operating system: Mac OS X 10.4.9 through 10.14.6
- RAM: 512 MB
- Free hard disk space: 1.5 GB
- Optical drive: DVD-ROM (for local installation)
- Notes: Unofficially runs on PowerPC G3 Macs (like the iMac G3 in Bondi Blue) and with less RAM

Microsoft Office 2008 for Mac is a version of the Microsoft Office productivity suite for Mac OS X. It supersedes Office 2004 for Mac (which did not have Intel native code) and is the Mac OS X equivalent of Office 2007. Office 2008 was developed by Microsoft's Macintosh Business Unit and released on January 15, 2008. Office 2008 was followed by Microsoft Office for Mac 2011 released on October 26, 2010, requiring a Mac with an Intel processor and Mac OS version 10.5 or higher. Office 2008 is also the last version to feature Entourage, which was replaced by Outlook in Office 2011. Microsoft stopped supporting Office 2008 on April 9, 2013.

== Release ==
Office 2008 was originally slated for release in the second half of 2007; however, it was delayed until January 2008, purportedly to allow time to fix lingering bugs.

Unlike Office 2007 for Windows, Office 2008 was not offered as a public beta before its scheduled release date.

== Features ==
Office 2008 for Mac includes the same core programs currently included with Office 2004 for Mac: Entourage, Excel, PowerPoint and Word.

Mac-only features included are a publishing layout view, which offers functionality similar to Microsoft Publisher for Windows, a "Ledger Sheet mode" in Excel to ease financial tasks, and a "My Day" application offering a quick way to view the day's events.

Office 2008 supports the new Office Open XML format, and defaults to saving all files in this format. On February 21, 2008, Geoff Price revealed that the format conversion update for Office 2004 would be delayed until June 2008 in order to provide the first update to Office 2008.

Microsoft Visual Basic for Applications is not supported in this version. As a result, such Excel add-ins dependent on VBA, such as Solver, have not been bundled in the current release. In June 2008, Microsoft announced that it was exploring the idea of bringing some of the functionality of Solver back to Excel. In late August 2008, Microsoft announced that a new Solver for Excel 2008 was available as a free download from Frontline Systems, original developers of the Excel Solver. However, Excel 2008 also lacks other functionality, such as Pivot Chart functionality, which has long been a feature in the Windows version. In May 2008, Microsoft announced that VBA would be making a return in the next version of Microsoft Office for Mac, with AppleScript and the Open Scripting Architecture still supported.

== Limitations ==
Error message in Microsoft Excel showing features that are not supported

Office 2008 for Mac lacks feature parity with the Windows version. The lack of Visual Basic for Applications (VBA) support in Excel makes it impossible to use macros programmed in VBA. Microsoft's response is that adding VBA support in Xcode would have resulted in an additional two years added to the development cycle of Office 2008. Other unsupported features include: OMML equations generated in Word 2007 for Windows, Office "Ribbon", Mini Toolbar, Live Preview, and an extensive list of features are unsupported such as equivalent SharePoint integration with the Windows version. Some features are missing on Excel 2008 for Mac, including: data filters (Data Bars, Top 10, Color-based, Icon-based), structured references, Excel tables, Table styles, a sort feature allowing more than three columns at once and more than one filter on a sort.

Benchmarks suggest that the original release of Office 2008 runs slower on Macs with PowerPC processors, and does not provide a significant speed bump for Macs with Intel processors.

A data-compatibility problem has also been noted with CambridgeSoft's chemical structure drawing program, ChemDraw. Word 2008 does not retain the structural information when a chemical structure is copied from ChemDraw and pasted into a document. If a structure is recopied from a Word 2008 document, and is pasted back into ChemDraw, it appears as a non-editable image rather than a recognized chemical structure. There is no such problem in Word 2004 or X. This issue has not been fixed in the SP2 (version 12.2.0, released in July 2009).

On May 13, 2008, Microsoft released Office 2008 Service Pack 1 as a free update. However, there have been many reports of the updater failing to install, resulting in a message saying that an updatable version of Office 2008 was not found. This appears to be related to users modifying the contents of the Microsoft Office folder in ways which do not cause problems with most other software (such as "localizing" using a program to remove application support files in unwanted languages), and which do not affect Office's operations, but which cause the updaters' installers to believe that the application is not valid for update. A small modification to the installer has been found an effective work-around (see reference).

Another widespread problem reported after SP1 is that Office files will no longer open in Office applications when opened (double-clicked) from the Mac OS X Finder or launched from other applications such as an email attachment. The trigger for this problem is that Microsoft in SP1 unilaterally and without warning deprecated certain older Mac OS 'Type' codes such as "WDBN" that some files may have, either because they are simply very old, or because some applications assign the older Type code when saving them to the disk. Users have seen the problem affect even relatively new Type codes, however, such as 'W6BN'. Microsoft is apparently looking into the problem, but it is unclear if they will reinstate the older Type codes, citing security concerns.

Another problem with cross-platform compatibility is that images inserted into any Office application by using either cut and paste or drag and drop result in a file that does not display the inserted graphic when viewed on a Windows machine. Instead, the Windows user is told "QuickTime and a TIFF (LZW) decompressor are needed to see this picture". A user presented one solution as far back as December 2004.

A further example of the lack of feature parity is the track changes function. Whereas users of Word 2003 or 2007 for Windows are able to choose freely between showing their changes in-line or as balloons in the right-hand margin, choosing the former option in Word 2004 or Word 2008 for Mac OS also turns off all comment balloons; comments in this case are visible only in the Reviewing Pane or as popup boxes (i.e. upon mouseover). This issue has not been resolved to date and is present in the latest version of Word for the Mac, namely Word 2011.

The toolbox found in Office 2008 also has problems when the OS X feature Spaces is used: switching from one Space to another will cause elements of the Toolbox to get trapped on one Space until the Toolbox is closed and reopened. The only remedy for this problem, as of December 2008, was to disable Spaces, or at least refrain from using it whilst working in Office 2008. Microsoft has acknowledged this problem and states that it is an architectural problem with the implementation of Spaces. Apple has been informed of the problem, according to Microsoft. The problem appears to be caused by the fact that the Toolbox is Carbon-based. Using Microsoft Office with Mac OS X 10.6 Snow Leopard solves some of the problems.

In addition, there is no support for right-to-left and bidirectional languages (such as Arabic, Hebrew, Persian, etc.) in Office 2008, making it impossible to read or edit a right-to-left document in Word 2008 or PowerPoint 2008. Languages such as Thai are similarly not supported, although installing fonts can sometimes allow documents written in these languages to be displayed.

Moreover, Office 2008 proofing tools support only a limited number of languages (Danish, Dutch, English, Finnish, French, German, Italian, Japanese, Norwegian, Portuguese, Spanish, Swedish, and Swiss German). Proofing tools for other languages failed to find their way to the installation pack, and are not offered by Microsoft commercially in the form of separately sold language packs. At the same time, Office applications are not integrated with the proofing tools native to Mac OS X 10.6 Snow Leopard.

Microsoft Visio is not available for OS X. This means that any embedded Visio diagrams in other Office documents (e.g. Word) cannot be edited in Office on the Mac. Embedded Visio diagrams appear as a low-quality bitmap both in the WYSIWYG editor and upon printing the document on the Mac.

Office for Mac 2008 also has a shorter lifecycle than Office 2007. Support for Office for Mac 2008 ended on April 9, 2013. As 32-bit software, it will not run on macOS Catalina or later versions of macOS. It is also not officially supported from OS X Mavericks to macOS Mojave.

== Editions ==
Comparison of different editions of Office 2008 for Mac
Applications and services	Home & Student	Standard	Business Edition	Special Media Edition
Word	Yes	Yes	Yes	Yes
PowerPoint	Yes	Yes	Yes	Yes
Excel	Yes	Yes	Yes	Yes
Entourage	Yes	Yes	Yes	Yes
Exchange Server support	No	Yes	Yes	Yes
Automator Actions	No	Yes	Yes	Yes
Office Live and SharePoint support	No	No	Yes	No
Expression Media	No	No	No	Yes

== See also ==
- Office suite
- Office Open XML software
- Comparison of Office Open XML and OpenDocument
