= Microsoft Office =

Suite of office software

- Developer: Microsoft
- Release: October 1, 1990; 36 years ago

Stable release(s)
- Office 2024 (LTSC): 2408 (Build 17932.21140) / 10 November 2026; 7 days ago
- Office 2021 (LTSC): 2108 (Build 14334.21048) / 10 November 2026; 7 days ago
- Office 2019 (LTSC): 1808 (Build 10417.20236) / 10 November 2026; 7 days ago
- Office 2024 (Retail): 2610 (Build 20527.20196) / 10 November 2026; 7 days ago
- Office 2021 (Retail): 2610 (Build 20527.20196) / 10 November 2026; 7 days ago
- Office 2019 (Retail): 2509 (Build 19231.20194) / 14 October 2025; 13 months ago

Preview release(s) [±]
- Written in: C++ (back-end), C++ and C# (API/UI)
- Operating system: Microsoft Windows, MS-DOS (discontinued)
- Successor: Microsoft 365
- Standard: Office Open XML (ISO/IEC 29500)
- Available in: 102 languages
- List of languages: Full (43): English, Arabic, Basque, Bulgarian, Catalan, Chinese (Simplified), Chinese (Traditional), Croatian, Czech, Danish, Dutch, Estonian, Finnish, French, Galician, German, Greek, Hebrew, Hindi, Hungarian, Indonesian, Italian, Japanese, Kazakh, Korean, Latvian, Lithuanian, Malay (Latin), Norwegian Bokmål, Polish, Portuguese (Brazil), Portuguese (Portugal), Romanian, Russian, Serbian (Latin, Serbia), Slovak, Slovenian, Spanish, Somali, Swedish, Thai, Turkish, Ukrainian, Vietnamese; Partial (48): Afrikaans, Albanian, Amharic, Armenian, Assamese, Azerbaijani (Latin), Bangla (Bangladesh), Bangla (Bengali India), Belarusian, Bosnian (Latin), Dari, Filipino, Georgian, Gujarati, Icelandic, Irish, Kannada, Khmer, Kiswahili, Konkani, Kyrgyz, Luxembourgish, Macedonian, Malayalam, Maltese, Maori, Marathi, Mongolian (Cyrillic), Nepali, Norwegian Nynorsk, Odia, Persian (Farsi), Punjabi (Gurmukhi), Quechua, Scottish Gaelic, Serbian (Cyrillic, Bosnia & Herzegovina), Serbian (Cyrillic, Serbia), Sindhi (Arabic), Sinhala, Tamil, Tatar (Cyrillic), Telugu, Turkmen (Latin), Urdu, Uyghur, Uzbek (Latin), Valencian, Welsh, Proofing only (11): Hausa, Igbo, isiXhosa, isiZulu, Kinyarwanda, Pashto, Romansh, Sesotho sa Leboa, Setswana, Wolof, Yoruba
- Type: Office suite
- License: Trialware, volume licensing or SaaS
- Website: office.com

Microsoft Office for Mobile
- Microsoft Office for Mobile apps on Windows 10
- Developer: Microsoft
- Release: April 19, 2000; 26 years ago
- Final release: 17.0 / October 2021; 5 years ago
- Operating system: Windows 10, Windows 10 Mobile, Windows Phone, iOS, iPadOS, Android, ChromeOS
- Platform: Smartphones and Tablet computers
- Type: Productivity software
- License: Proprietary software: Windows 10 Mobile and Windows Phone: Built-in; Others: Freeware, with shareware features
- Website: www.office.com

Microsoft Office for Mac
- Microsoft Office 2021 for Mac apps from top left to bottom right: Word, Excel, PowerPoint and Outlook
- Developer: Microsoft
- Release: August 1, 1989; 37 years ago
- Stable release: Microsoft Office 2024
- Written in: C++ (back-end), Objective-C (API/UI)
- Operating system: macOS; Classic Mac OS (discontinued)
- Available in: 16 languages
- List of languages English, Arabic, Chinese (Simplified), Chinese (Traditional), Danish, Dutch, Finnish, French, German, Italian, Japanese, Norwegian (Bokmål), Polish, Portuguese (Brazil), Russian, Spanish, Swedish
- Type: Office suite
- License: Proprietary commercial software (retail, volume licensing, SaaS)
- Website: www.office.com

Microsoft Office, MS Office, or simply Office, is an office suite and (formerly) a family of client software, server software, and services developed by Microsoft. The first version of the Office suite, announced by Bill Gates on August 1, 1988, at COMDEX, contained Microsoft Word, Microsoft Excel, and Microsoft PowerPoint, all three of which remain core products in Office. Over time, the Office suite has grown substantially, adding programs such as OneNote and Outlook; the suite has also been made highly extensible with the use of the VBA scripting language.

The suite currently includes a word processor (Word), a spreadsheet program (Excel), a presentation program (PowerPoint), a note-taking program (OneNote), and an email client (Outlook); the Windows version also includes a database management system (Access). Microsoft Office is available as desktop, Android/iOS mobile and web applications; mobile versions for Windows and other discontinued platforms are no longer supported.

Since Office 2013, Microsoft has promoted Microsoft 365 (formerly Office 365) as the primary means of obtaining Microsoft Office: it allows the use of the software and other services on a subscription business model, and users receive feature updates to the software for the lifetime of the subscription, including new features and cloud computing integration that are not necessarily included in the "on-premises" releases of Office sold under conventional license terms. In 2017, revenue from Office 365 overtook conventional license sales.

Microsoft continues to sell the perpetually licensed Office suite, the latest version of which is Office 2024.

== Components ==
=== Core applications and services ===
- Microsoft Word is a word processor included in Microsoft Office and some editions of the now-discontinued Microsoft Works. The first version of Word, released in the autumn of 1983, was for the MS-DOS operating system and introduced the computer mouse to more users. Word 1.0 could be purchased with a bundled mouse, though none was required. Following the precedents of LisaWrite and MacWrite, Word for Macintosh attempted to add closer WYSIWYG features into its package. Word for Mac was released in 1985. Word for Mac was the first graphical version of Microsoft Word. Initially, it implemented the proprietary .doc format as its primary format. Word 2007, however, deprecated this format in favor of Office Open XML, which was later standardized by Ecma International as an open format. Support for Portable Document Format (PDF) and OpenDocument (ODF) was first introduced in Word for Windows with Service Pack 2 for Word 2007.
- Microsoft Excel is a spreadsheet editor that originally competed with the dominant Lotus 1-2-3 and eventually outsold it. Microsoft released the first version of Excel for the Mac OS in 1985 and the first Windows version (numbered 2.05 to line up with the Mac) in November 1987.
- Microsoft PowerPoint is a presentation program used to create slideshows composed of text, graphics, and other objects, which can be displayed on-screen and shown by the presenter or printed out on transparencies or slides.
- Microsoft OneNote is a notetaking program that gathers handwritten or typed notes, drawings, screen clippings and audio commentaries. Notes can be shared with other OneNote users over the Internet or a network. OneNote was initially introduced as a standalone app that was not included in any Microsoft Office 2003 edition. However, OneNote eventually became a core component of Microsoft Office; with the release of Microsoft Office 2013, OneNote was included in all Microsoft Office offerings. OneNote is also available as a web app on Office on the web, a freemium (and later freeware) Windows desktop app, a mobile app for Windows Phone, iOS, Android, and Symbian, and a Metro-style app for Windows 8 or later.
- Microsoft Outlook (not to be confused with Outlook Express, Outlook.com or Outlook on the web) is a personal information manager that replaces Windows Messaging, Microsoft Mail, and Schedule+ starting in Office 97; it includes an e-mail client, calendar, task manager and address book. On the Mac OS, Microsoft offered several versions of Outlook in the late 1990s, but only for use with Microsoft Exchange Server. In Office 2001, it introduced an alternative application with a slightly different feature set called Microsoft Entourage. It reintroduced Outlook in Office 2011, replacing Entourage.
- Microsoft OneDrive is a file hosting service that allows users to sync files and later access them from a web browser or mobile device.
- Microsoft Teams is a platform that combines workplace chat, meetings, notes, and attachments.

=== Windows-only programs ===
- Microsoft Publisher is a desktop publishing app for Windows mostly used for designing brochures, labels, calendars, greeting cards, business cards, newsletters, web sites, and postcards. Publisher will be discontinued in 2026.
- Microsoft Access is a database management system for Windows that combines the relational Access Database Engine (formerly Jet Database Engine) with a graphical user interface and software development tools. Microsoft Access stores data in its own format based on the Access Database Engine. It can also import or link directly to data stored in other applications and databases.
- Microsoft Project is a project management app for Windows to keep track of events and to create network charts and Gantt charts, not bundled in any Office suite.
- Microsoft Visio is a diagram and flowcharting app for Windows not bundled in any Office suite.

=== Mobile apps ===
- Office Lens is an image scanner optimized for mobile devices. It captures the document (e.g. business card, paper, whiteboard) via the camera and then straightens the document portion of the image. The result can be exported to Word, OneNote, PowerPoint or Outlook, or saved in OneDrive, sent via Mail or placed in Photo Library.
- Office Mobile is a unified Office mobile app for Android and iOS, which combines Word, Excel, and PowerPoint into a single app and introduces new capabilities as making quick notes, signing PDFs, scanning QR codes, and transferring files.
- Office Remote is an application that turns the mobile device into a remote control for desktop versions of Word, Excel and PowerPoint.

=== Server applications ===
- Microsoft SharePoint is a web-based collaborative platform that integrates with Microsoft Office. Launched in 2001, SharePoint is primarily sold as a document management and storage system, but the product is highly configurable and usage varies substantially among organizations. SharePoint services include:
  - Excel Services is a spreadsheet editing server similar to Microsoft Excel.
  - InfoPath Forms Services is a form distribution server similar to Microsoft InfoPath.
  - Microsoft Project Server is a project management server similar to Microsoft Project.
  - Microsoft Search Server
- Skype for Business Server is a real-time communications server for instant messaging and video-conferencing.
- Microsoft Exchange Server is a mail server and calendaring server.

=== Web services ===
- Microsoft Sway is a presentation web app released in October 2014. It also has a native app for iOS and Windows 10.
- Delve is a service that allows Office 365 users to search and manage their emails, meetings, contacts, social networks and documents stored on OneDrive or Sites in Office 365.
- Microsoft Forms is an online survey creator, available for Office 365 Education subscribers.
- Microsoft To Do is a task management service.
- Outlook.com is a free webmail with a user interface similar to Microsoft Outlook.
- Outlook on the web is a webmail client similar to Outlook.com but more comprehensive and available only through Office 365 and Microsoft Exchange Server offerings.
- Microsoft Planner is a planning application available on the Microsoft Office 365 platform.
- Microsoft Stream is a corporate video sharing service for enterprise users with an Office 365 Academic or Enterprise license.
- Microsoft Bookings is an appointment booking application on the Microsoft Office 365 platform.

== Office for the web ==
Office on the web

- Clockwise from top left: Word, Excel, OneNote and PowerPoint in Office on the web as of June 2026
- Website type: Spreadsheet; Presentation; Notetaking; Word processor; Web mail; File hosting service
- Dissolved: 2017
- Successor: Microsoft 365
- Owner: Microsoft
- Creator: Microsoft
- Website: www.microsoft.com/en/microsoft-365/free-office-online-for-the-web
- IPv6 support: Yes
- Commercial: Freemium
- Registration: Mandatory for webmail and file sharing; optional for others
- Launched: June 7, 2010; 16 years ago

Office for the web was a free web version of Microsoft Office that included three web applications: Word, Excel and PowerPoint. The offering also included Outlook.com, OneNote and OneDrive; these are accessible through a unified app switcher. Users can install the on-premises version of this service, called Office Online Server, in private clouds in conjunction with SharePoint, Microsoft Exchange Server and Microsoft Lync Server.

Word, Excel, and PowerPoint for the web could natively open, edit, and save Office Open XML files (docx, xlsx, pptx) as well as OpenDocument files (odt, ods, odp). They could also open files with legacy Office formats (doc, xls, ppt), but these were converted to the newer formats once edited. Password-encrypted Office files could not be opened. Files with macros could be opened in the browser apps, but the macros could not be accessed or executed. In July 2013, Word gained the ability to render PDF documents or convert them to Microsoft Word documents, although the formatting of the document may have deviated from the original. In November 2013, the apps started supporting real-time co-authoring and autosaving files.

Office for the web lacked a number of the advanced features present in the full desktop versions of Office, including the programs Access and Publisher. However, users were able to select the command "Open in desktop app"; this brought up the document in the desktop version of Office on their computer or device to utilize the advanced features there.

The Personal edition of Office for the web was made available to the public free of charge via Office.com, superseding previous services such as SkyDrive (later OneDrive) and Office Live Workspace. Enterprise-managed versions were available through Office 365. In February 2013, the ability to view and edit files on SkyDrive without signing in was added. The service could also be installed privately in enterprise environments as a SharePoint app, or through Office Web Apps Server. Microsoft also offered other web apps in the Office suite, such as the Outlook Web App (formerly Outlook Web Access), Lync Web App (formerly Office Communicator Web Access), Project Web App (formerly Project Web Access). Additionally, Microsoft offers a service under the name of Online Doc Viewer to view Office documents on a website via Office on the web.

In 2017, Office for the web was replaced by Microsoft 365; the service, including the former Word, Excel, and PowerPoint web applications, is no longer accessible.

== Common features ==
Most versions of Microsoft Office (including Office 97 and later) use their own widget set and do not exactly match the native operating system. This is most apparent in Microsoft Office XP and 2003, where the standard menus were replaced with a colored, flat-looking, shadowed menu style.

The user interface of a particular version of Microsoft Office often heavily influences a subsequent version of Microsoft Windows, e.g.:

- The toolbar, colored buttons and the gray-colored 3D look of Office 4.3 were added to Windows 95.
- The ribbon, introduced in Office 2007, has been incorporated into several programs bundled with Windows 7 and later.
- The flat, box-like design of Office 2013 (released in 2012) was replicated in Windows 8's new UI revamp.

Users of Microsoft Office may access external data via connection-specifications saved in Office Data Connection (.odc) files.

Office, on all platforms, supports editing both server files (in real time) and offline files (manually saved) in recent years. The support for editing server files (in real time) was originally introduced (in its current form) after the introduction of OneDrive (formerly SkyDrive). But, older versions of Office also have the ability to edit server files (notably Office 2007).

Both Windows and Office used service packs to update software. Office had non-cumulative service releases, which were discontinued after Office 2000 Service Release 1. Now, Windows and Office have shifted to predictable (monthly, semi-annual and annual) release schemes to update software.

Past versions of Office often contained Easter eggs. For example, Excel 97 contained a reasonably functional flight-simulator.

== File formats and metadata ==
Microsoft Office prior to Office 2007 used proprietary file formats based on the OLE Compound File Binary Format. This forced users who share data to adopt the same software platform. In 2008, Microsoft made the entire documentation for the binary Office formats freely available for download and granted any possible patents rights for use or implementations of those binary format for free under the Open Specification Promise. Previously, Microsoft had supplied such documentation freely but only on request.

Starting with Office 2007, the default file format has been a version of Office Open XML, though different from the one standardized and published by Ecma International and by ISO/IEC. Microsoft has granted patent rights to the formats technology under the Open Specification Promise and has made available free downloadable converters for previous versions of Microsoft Office including Office 2003, Office XP, Office 2000 and Office 2004 for Mac OS X. Third-party implementations of Office Open XML exist on the Windows platform (Collabora Office, LibreOffice), macOS platform (iWork '08, Collabora Office, LibreOffice) and Linux (Collabora Office and LibreOffice). In addition, Office 2010, Service Pack 2 for Office 2007, and Office 2016 for Mac supports the OpenDocument Format (ODF) for opening and saving documents – only the old ODF 1.0 (2006 ISO/IEC standard) is supported, not the 1.2 version (2015 ISO/IEC standard).

Microsoft provides the ability to remove metadata from Office documents. This was in response to highly publicized incidents where sensitive data about a document was leaked via its metadata. Metadata removal was first available in 2004, when Microsoft released a tool called Remove Hidden Data Add-in for Office 2003/XP for this purpose. It was directly integrated into Office 2007 in a feature called the Document Inspector.

== Extensibility ==
A major feature of the Office suite is the ability for users and third-party companies to write add-ins (plug-ins) that extend the capabilities of an application by adding custom commands and specialized features. One of the new features is the Office Store. Plugins and other tools can be downloaded by users. Developers can make money by selling their applications in the Office Store. The revenue is divided between the developer and Microsoft where the developer gets 80% of the money. Developers are able to share applications with all Office users.

The app travels with the document, and it is for the developer to decide what the recipient will see when they open it. The recipient will either have the option to download the app from the Office Store for free, start a free trial or be directed to payment. With Office's cloud abilities, IT departments can create a set of apps for their business employees in order to increase their productivity. When employees go to the Office Store, they'll see their company's apps under My Organization. The apps that employees have personally downloaded will appear under My Apps. Developers can use web technologies like HTML5, XML, CSS3, JavaScript, and APIs for building the apps. An application for Office is a webpage that is hosted inside an Office client application. Users can use apps to amplify the functionality of a document, email message, meeting request, or appointment. Apps can run in multiple environments and by multiple clients, including rich Office desktop clients, Office Web Apps, mobile browsers, and also on-premises and in the cloud. The type of add-ins supported differ by Office versions:

- Office 97 onwards (standard Windows DLLs i.e. Word WLLs and Excel XLLs)
- Office 2000 onwards (COM add-ins)
- Office XP onwards (COM/OLE Automation add-ins)
- Office 2003 onwards (Managed code add-ins – VSTO solutions)

== Password protection ==
Microsoft Office has a security feature that allows users to encrypt Office (Word, Excel, PowerPoint, Access, Skype Business) documents with a user-provided password. The password can contain up to 255 characters and uses AES 128-bit advanced encryption by default. Passwords can also be used to restrict modification of the entire document, worksheet or presentation. Due to lack of document encryption, though, these passwords can be removed using a third-party cracking software.

== Support policies ==
=== Approach ===
All versions of Microsoft Office products from Office 2000 to Office 2016 are eligible for ten years of support following their release, during which Microsoft releases security updates for the product version and provides paid technical support. The ten-year period is divided into two five-year phases: The mainstream phase and the extended phase. During the mainstream phase, Microsoft may provide limited complimentary technical support and release non-security updates or change the design of the product. During the extended phase, said services stop. Office 2019 only receives 5 years of mainstream and 2 years of extended support and Office 2021 only gets 5 years of mainstream support.

=== Timelines of support ===
Timeline of Microsoft Office for Windows
Office 2024
Office 2021
Office 2019
Office 2016
Office 2013
Office 2010
Office 2007
Office 2003
Office XP
Office 2000
Office 97
Office 95
│
1995
│
1996
│
1997
│
1998
│
1999
│
2000
│
2001
│
2002
│
2003
│
2004
│
2005
│
2006
│
2007
│
2008
│
2009
│
2010
│
2011
│
2012
│
2013
│
2014
│
2015
│
2016
│
2017
│
2018
│
2019
│
2020
│
2021
│
2022
│
2023
│
2024
│
2025
│
2026
│
2027
│
2028
│
2029
- (Spent) standard support
- (Remaining) standard support
- (Spent) extended support
- (Remaining) extended support
Timeline of Microsoft Office for Mac
Office 2024
Office 2021
Office 2019
Office 2016
Office for Mac 2011
Office 2008 for Mac
Office 2004 for Mac
Office v. X
Office 2001
Office 98 Macintosh Edition
│
1995
│
1996
│
1997
│
1998
│
1999
│
2000
│
2001
│
2002
│
2003
│
2004
│
2005
│
2006
│
2007
│
2008
│
2009
│
2010
│
2011
│
2012
│
2013
│
2014
│
2015
│
2016
│
2017
│
2018
│
2019
│
2020
│
2021
│
2022
│
2023
│
2024
│
2025
│
2026
│
2027
│
2028
│
2029
- (Spent) standard support
- (Remaining) standard support
- (Spent) extended support
- (Remaining) extended support

== Platforms ==
Microsoft supports Office for the Windows and macOS platforms, as well as mobile versions for Windows Phone, Android and iOS platforms. Beginning with Mac Office 4.2, the macOS and Windows versions of Office share the same file format, and are interoperable. Visual Basic for Applications support was dropped in Microsoft Office 2008 for Mac, then reintroduced in Office for Mac 2011.

Microsoft Office was also developed for all non-x86 Windows NT platforms, including MIPS, DEC Alpha, and PowerPC.

== Pricing model and editions ==
The Microsoft Office applications and suites are sold via retail channels, and volume licensing for larger organizations (also including the "Home Use Program". allowing users at participating organizations to buy low-cost licenses for use on their personal devices as part of their employer's volume license agreement).

In 2010, Microsoft introduced a software as a service platform known as Office 365, to provide cloud-hosted versions of Office's server software, including Exchange e-mail and SharePoint, on a subscription basis (competing in particular with Google Apps). Following the release of Office 2013, Microsoft began to offer Office 365 plans for the consumer market, with access to Microsoft Office software on multiple devices with free feature updates over the life of the subscription, as well as other services such as OneDrive storage.

Microsoft has since promoted Office 365 as the primary means of purchasing Microsoft Office. Although there are still "on-premises" releases roughly every three years, Microsoft marketing emphasizes that they do not receive new features or access to new cloud-based services as they are released unlike Office 365, as well as other benefits for consumer and business markets. Office 365 revenue overtook traditional license sales for Office in 2017.

=== Editions ===
Microsoft Office is available in several editions, which regroup a given number of applications for a specific price. Primarily, Microsoft sells Office as Microsoft 365. The editions are as follows:

- Microsoft 365 Personal
- Microsoft 365 Family
- Microsoft 365 Business Basic
- Microsoft 365 Business Standard
- Microsoft 365 Business Premium
- Microsoft 365 apps for business
- Microsoft 365 apps for enterprise
- Office 365 E1, E3, E5
- Office 365 A1, A3, A5 (for education)
- Office 365 G1, G3, G5 (for government)
- Microsoft 365 F1, F3, Office 365 F3 (for frontline)

Microsoft sells Office for a one-time purchase as Home & Student and Home & Business, however, these editions do not receive major updates.

=== Education pricing ===
Post-secondary students may obtain the university edition of Microsoft Office 365 subscription. It is limited to one user and two devices, plus the subscription price is valid for four years instead of just one. Apart from this, the university edition is identical in features to the Home Premium version. This marks the first time Microsoft does not offer physical or permanent software at academic pricing, in contrast to the university versions of Office 2010 and Office 2011. In addition, students eligible for DreamSpark program may receive select standalone Microsoft Office apps free of charge.

== Discontinued applications and features ==
- Binder was an application that can incorporate several documents into one file and was originally designed as a container system for storing related documents in a single file. The complexity of use and learning curve led to little usage, and it was discontinued after Office XP.
- Bookshelf was a reference collection introduced in 1987 as part of Microsoft's extensive work in promoting CD-ROM technology as a distribution medium for electronic publishing.
- Data Analyzer was a business intelligence program for graphical visualization of data and its analysis.
- Docs.com was a public document sharing service where Office users can upload and share Word, Excel, PowerPoint, Sway and PDF files for the whole world to discover and use.
- Entourage was an Outlook counterpart on macOS, Microsoft discontinued it in favor of extending the Outlook brand name.
- FrontPage was a WYSIWYG HTML editor and website administration tool for Windows. It was branded as part of the Microsoft Office suite from 1997 to 2003. FrontPage was discontinued in December 2006 and replaced by Microsoft SharePoint Designer and Microsoft Expression Web.
- InfoPath was a Windows application for designing and distributing rich XML-based forms. The last version was included in Office 2013.
- InterConnect was a business-relationship database available only in Japan.
- Internet Explorer was a graphical web browser and one of the main participants of the first browser war. It was included in Office until XP when it was removed. It was replaced with Edge.
- Mail was a mail client (in old versions of Office, later replaced by Microsoft Schedule Plus and subsequently Microsoft Outlook).
- Accounting (formerly Small Business Accounting) was an accounting software application from Microsoft targeted towards small businesses that had between 1 and 25 employees.
- Assistant (included since Office 97 on Windows and Office 98 on Mac as a part of Agent technology) was a system that uses animated characters to offer context-sensitive suggestions to users and access to the help system. The Assistant is often dubbed "Clippy" or "Clippit", due to its default to a paper clip character, coded as CLIPPIT.ACS. The latest versions that include the Office Assistant were Office 2003 (Windows) and Office 2004 (Mac).
- Document Image Writer was a virtual printer that takes documents from Microsoft Office or any other application and prints them, or stores them in an image file as TIFF or Microsoft Document Imaging Format format. It was discontinued with Office 2010.
- Document Imaging was an application that supports editing scanned documents. Discontinued Office 2010.
- Document Scanning was a scanning and OCR application. Discontinued Office 2010.
- Picture Manager was a basic photo management software (similar to Google's Picasa or Adobe's Photoshop Elements), that replaced Microsoft Photo Editor.
- PhotoDraw was a graphics program that was first released as part of the Office 2000 Premium Edition. A later version for Windows XP compatibility was released, known as PhotoDraw 2000 Version 2. Microsoft discontinued the program in 2001.
- Photo Editor was photo-editing or raster-graphics software in older Office versions up to Office XP. It was supplemented by Microsoft PhotoDraw in Office 2000 Premium edition.
- Schedule Plus (also shown as Schedule+) was released with Office 95. It featured a planner, to-do list, and contact information. Its functions were incorporated into Microsoft Outlook.
- SharePoint Designer was a WYSIWYG HTML editor and website administration tool. Microsoft attempted to turn it into a specialized HTML editor for SharePoint sites, but failed on this project and wanted to discontinue it.
- SharePoint Workspace (formerly Groove) was a proprietary peer-to-peer document collaboration software designed for teams with members who are regularly offline or who do not share the same network security clearance.
- Skype for Business was an integrated communications client for conferences and meetings in real-time; it is the only Microsoft Office desktop app that is neither useful without a proper network infrastructure nor has the "Microsoft" prefix in its name.
- Streets & Trips (known in other countries as Microsoft AutoRoute) is a discontinued mapping program developed and distributed by Microsoft.
- Unbind is a program that can extract the contents of a Binder file. Unbind can be installed from the Office XP CD-ROM.
- Virtual PC was included with Microsoft Office Professional Edition 2004 for Mac. Microsoft discontinued support for Virtual PC on the Mac in 2006 owing to new Macs possessing the same Intel architecture as Windows PCs. It emulated a standard PC and its hardware.
- Vizact was a program that "activated" documents using HTML, adding effects such as animation. It allows users to create dynamic documents for the Web. The development has ended due to unpopularity.

=== Discontinued server applications ===
- Forms lets users use any browser to access and fill InfoPath forms. Office Forms Server is a standalone server installation of InfoPath Forms Services.
- Groove was centrally managing all deployments of Microsoft Office Groove in the enterprise.
- Project Portfolio allows creation of a project portfolio, including workflows, which is hosted centrally.
- PerformancePoint allows customers to monitor, analyze, and plan their business.

=== Discontinued web services ===
- Office Live
  - Office Live Small Business had web hosting services and online collaboration tools for small businesses.
  - Office Live Workspace had online storage and collaboration service for documents, which was superseded by Office on the web.
- Office Live Meeting was a web conferencing service.

== Criticism ==
=== Data formats ===
Microsoft Office has been criticized in the past for using proprietary file formats rather than open standards, which forces users who share data into adopting the same software platform. However, on February 15, 2008, Microsoft made the entire documentation for the binary Office formats freely available under the Open Specification Promise. Also, Office Open XML, the document format for the latest versions of Office for Windows and Mac, has been standardized under both Ecma International and ISO. Ecma International has published the Office Open XML specification free of copyrights and Microsoft has granted patent rights to the formats technology under the Open Specification Promise and has made available free downloadable converters for previous versions of Microsoft Office including Office 2003, Office XP, Office 2000 and Office 2004 for the Mac. Third-party implementations of Office Open XML exist on the Mac platform (iWork 08) and Linux (OpenOffice.org 2.3 – Novell Edition only).

=== Unicode and bi-directional texts ===
Another point of criticism Microsoft Office has faced was the lack of support in its Mac versions for Unicode and Bidirectional text languages, notably Arabic and Hebrew. This issue, which had existed since the first release in 1989, was addressed in the 2016 version.

=== Privacy ===
On November 13, 2018, a report initiated by the Government of the Netherlands concluded that Microsoft Office 2016 and Office 365 do not comply with GDPR, the European law which regulates data protection and privacy for all citizens in and outside the EU and EFTA region. The investigation was initiated by the observation that Microsoft does not reveal or share publicly any data collected about users of its software. In addition, the company does not provide users of its (Office) software an option to turn off diagnostic and telemetry data sent back to the company. Researchers found that most of the data that the Microsoft software collects and "sends home" is diagnostics. Researchers also observed that Microsoft "seemingly tried to make the system GDPR compliant by storing Office documents on servers based in the EU". However, they discovered the software packages collected additional data that contained private user information, some of which was stored on servers located in the US. The Netherlands Ministry of Justice hired Privacy Company to probe and evaluate the use of Microsoft Office products in the public sector. "Microsoft systematically collects data on a large scale about the individual use of Word, Excel, PowerPoint, and Outlook. Covertly, without informing people", researchers of the Privacy Company stated in their blog post. "Microsoft does not offer any choice with regard to the amount of data, or possibility to switch off the collection, or ability to see what data are collected, because the data stream is encoded."

The researchers commented that there is no need for Microsoft to store information such as IPs and email addresses, which are collected automatically by the software. "Microsoft should not store these transient, functional data, unless the retention is strictly necessary, for example, for security purposes", the researchers conclude in the final report by the Netherlands Ministry of Justice.

As a result of this in-depth study and its conclusions, the Netherlands regulatory body concluded that Microsoft has violated GDPR "on many counts" including "lack of transparency and purpose limitation, and the lack of a legal ground for the processing." Microsoft has provided the Dutch authorities with an "improvement plan" that should satisfy Dutch regulators that it "would end all violations". The Dutch regulatory body is monitoring the situation and states that "If progress is deemed insufficient or if the improvements offered are unsatisfactory, SLM Microsoft Rijk will reconsider its position and may ask the Dutch Data Protection Authority to carry out a prior consultation and to impose enforcement measures." When asked for a response by an IT professional publication, a Microsoft spokesperson stated: "We are committed to our customers’ privacy, putting them in control of their data and ensuring that Office ProPlus and other Microsoft products and services comply with GDPR and other applicable laws. We appreciate the opportunity to discuss our diagnostic data handling practices in Office ProPlus with the Dutch Ministry of Justice and look forward to a successful resolution of any concerns." The user privacy data issue affects ProPlus subscriptions of Microsoft Office 2016 and Microsoft Office 365, including the online version of Microsoft Office 365.

== History of releases ==
Legend:
Unsupported
Supported
Latest version
Future version

Windows
Office version	Version number	Minimum operating system		Office support end date
3.x	Various	Windows	3.0	September 30, 1998
4.x	6.0	Windows	3.1	November 1, 2000
95	7.0	Windows	NT 3.51	December 31, 2001
97	8.0	Windows	NT 3.51 SP5	January 16, 2004
2000	9.0	Windows	95	July 14, 2009
XP	10.0	Windows	NT 4.0 SP6a	July 12, 2011
2003	11.0	Windows	2000 SP3	April 8, 2014
2007	12.0	Windows	XP SP2	October 10, 2017
2010	14.0	Windows	XP SP3	October 13, 2020
2013	15.0	Windows	7	April 11, 2023
2016	16.0	Windows	7 SP1	October 14, 2025
2019	16.0	Windows	10 v1809	October 14, 2025
2021	16.0	Windows	10 v1809	October 13, 2026
2024	16.0	Windows	10 v1809	October 9, 2029

Mac
Office version	Version number	Minimum operating system		Office support end date
3.0	6.0	Classic; Mac OS	?	June 1, 2001
4.2 for Macintosh	7.0	Classic; Mac OS	7.0 (68K)	December 31, 1996
98 Macintosh Edition	8.0	Classic; Mac OS	7.5 (PPC)	June 30, 2003
2001	9.0	Classic; Mac OS	8.1 (PPC)	December 31, 2005
v. X	10.0	macOS	10.1	January 9, 2007
2004 for Mac	11.0	macOS	10.2	January 10, 2012
2008 for Mac	12.0	macOS	10.4 (PPC)	April 9, 2013
2011 for Mac	14.0	macOS	10.5 (Intel)	October 10, 2017
2016	15.0 – 16.16.x	macOS	10.10	October 13, 2020
2019	16.17 – 16.52	macOS	10.12	October 10, 2023
2021	16.53+	macOS	10.15	October 13, 2026
2024	TBA	macOS	12	October 9, 2029

iOS & Android
Office version	Version number	Minimum operating system
Android for Word, Excel, PowerPoint	16.0	Android Pie (9.0)
iOS for Word, Excel, PowerPoint	2.80	iOS 16
iOS (Beta Channel) for Word, Excel, PowerPoint and Office Mobile	2.80	iOS 16 with TestFlight installed.
OneNote for iOS	16.80	iOS 16
OneNote (Beta Channel) for iOS	16.80	iOS 16 with TestFlight installed.

== Version history ==
=== Windows versions ===
==== Microsoft Office for Windows ====
Microsoft Office for Windows started in October 1990 as a bundle of three applications designed for Microsoft Windows 3.0: Microsoft Word for Windows 1.1, Microsoft Excel for Windows 2.0, and Microsoft PowerPoint for Windows 2.0.

Microsoft Office for Windows 1.5 updated the suite with Microsoft Excel 3.0.

Version 1.6 added Microsoft Mail for PC Networks 2.1 to the bundle.

==== Microsoft Office 3.0 ====
Microsoft Office 3.0, also called Microsoft Office 92, was released on August 30, 1992, and contained Word 2.0, Excel 4.0, PowerPoint 3.0 and Mail 3.0. It was the first version of Office also released on CD-ROM. In 1993, Microsoft Office Professional was released, which added Microsoft Access 1.1. By then more than half of Microsoft products were sold as suites.

==== Microsoft Office 4.x ====
Microsoft Office 4.0 was released containing Word 6.0, Excel 4.0a, PowerPoint 3.0 and Mail in 1993. Word's version number jumped from 2.0 to 6.0 so that it would have the same version number as the MS-DOS and Macintosh versions (Excel and PowerPoint were already numbered the same as the Macintosh versions).

Microsoft Office 4.2 for Windows NT was released in 1994 for i386, Alpha, MIPS and PowerPC architectures, containing Word 6.0 and Excel 5.0 (both 32-bit), PowerPoint 4.0 (16-bit), and Microsoft Office Manager 4.2 (the precursor to the Office Shortcut Bar)).

==== Microsoft Office 95 ====
Microsoft Office 95 was released on August 24, 1995. Software version numbers were altered again to create parity across the suite – every program was called version 7.0 meaning all but Word missed out versions. Office 95 included new components to the suite such as Schedule+ and Binder. Office for Windows 95 was designed as a fully 32-bit version to match Windows 95 although some apps not bundled as part of the suite at that time - Publisher for Windows 95 and Project 95 had some 16-bit components even though their main program executable was 32-bit.

Office 95 was available in two versions, Office 95 Standard and Office 95 Professional. The standard version consisted of Word 7.0, Excel 7.0, PowerPoint 7.0, and Schedule+ 7.0. The professional edition contained all of the items in the standard version plus Access 7.0. If the professional version was purchased in CD-ROM form, it also included Bookshelf.

The logo used in Office 95 returns in Office 97, 2000 and XP. Microsoft Office 98 Macintosh Edition also uses a similar logo.

==== Microsoft Office 97 ====
Microsoft Office 97 (Office 8.0) included hundreds of new features and improvements, such as introducing command bars, a paradigm in which menus and toolbars were made more similar in capability and visual design. Office 97 also featured Natural Language Systems and grammar checking. Office 97 featured new components to the suite including FrontPage 97, Expedia Streets 98 (in Small Business Edition), and Internet Explorer 3.0 & 4.0.

Office 97 was the first version of Office to include the Office Assistant. In Brazil, it was also the first version to introduce the Registration Wizard, a precursor to Microsoft Product Activation. With this release, the accompanying apps, Project 98 and Publisher 98 also transitioned to fully 32-bit versions. Exchange Server, a mail server and calendaring server developed by Microsoft, is the server for Outlook after discontinuing Exchange Client.

==== Microsoft Office 2000 ====
Microsoft Office 2000 (Office 9.0) introduced adaptive menus, where little-used options were hidden from the user. It also introduced a new security feature, built around digital signatures, to diminish the threat of macro viruses. The Microsoft Script Editor, an optional tool that can edit script code, was also introduced in Office 2000. Office 2000 automatically trusts macros (written in VBA 6) that were digitally signed from authors who have been previously designated as trusted. Office 2000 also introduces PhotoDraw, a raster and vector imaging program, as well as Web Components, Visio, and Vizact.

The Registration Wizard, a precursor to Microsoft Product Activation, remained in Brazil and was also extended to Australia and New Zealand, though not for volume-licensed editions. Academic software in the United States and Canada also featured the Registration Wizard.

==== Microsoft Office XP ====
Microsoft Office XP (Office 10.0 or Office 2002) was released in conjunction with Windows XP, and was a major upgrade with numerous enhancements and changes over Office 2000. Office XP introduced the Safe Mode feature, which allows applications such as Outlook to boot when it might otherwise fail by bypassing a corrupted registry or a faulty add-in. Smart tag is a technology introduced with Office XP in Word and Excel and discontinued in Office 2010.

Office XP also introduces new components including Document Imaging, Document Scanning, Clip Organizer, MapPoint, and Data Analyzer. Binder was replaced by Unbind, a program that can extract the contents of a Binder file. Unbind can be installed from the Office XP CD-ROM.

Office XP includes integrated voice command and text dictation capabilities, as well as handwriting recognition. It was the first version to require Microsoft Product Activation worldwide and in all editions as an anti-piracy measure, which attracted widespread controversy. Product Activation remained absent from Office for Mac releases until it was introduced in Office 2011 for Mac.

==== Microsoft Office 2003 ====
Microsoft Office 2003 (Office 11.0) was released in 2003. It featured a new logo. Two new applications made their debut in Office 2003: Microsoft InfoPath and OneNote. It is the first version to use new, more colorful icons. Outlook 2003 provides improved functionality in many areas, including Kerberos authentication, RPC over HTTP, Cached Exchange Mode, and an improved junk mail filter.

Office 2003 introduces three new programs to the Office product lineup: InfoPath, a program for designing, filling, and submitting electronic structured data forms; OneNote, a note-taking program for creating and organizing diagrams, graphics, handwritten notes, recorded audio, and text; and the Picture Manager graphics software which can open, manage, and share digital images.

SharePoint, a web collaboration platform codenamed as Office Server, has integration and compatibility with Office 2003 and so on.

==== Microsoft Office 2007 ====
Microsoft Office 2007 (Office 12.0) was released in 2007. Office 2007's new features include a new graphical user interface called the Fluent User Interface, replacing the menus and toolbars that have been the cornerstone of Office since its inception with a tabbed toolbar, known as the Ribbon; new XML-based file formats called Office Open XML; and the inclusion of Groove, a collaborative software application.

While Microsoft removed Data Analyzer, FrontPage, Vizact, and Schedule+ from Office 2007; they also added Communicator, Groove, SharePoint Designer, and Office Customization Tool (OCT) to the suite.

==== Microsoft Office 2010 ====
Microsoft Office 2010 (Office 14.0, Microsoft skipped 13.0 due to fear of 13) was finalized on April 15, 2010, and made available to consumers on June 15, 2010. The main features of Office 2010 include the backstage file menu, new collaboration tools, a customizable ribbon, protected view and a navigation panel. Office Communicator, an instant messaging and videotelephony application, was renamed into Lync 2010.

This is the first version to ship in 32-bit and 64-bit variants. Microsoft Office 2010 featured a new logo, which resembled the 2007 logo, except in gold, and with a modification in shape. Microsoft released Service Pack 1 for Office 2010 on June 28, 2011 and Service Pack 2 on July 16, 2013. Office Online was first released online along with SkyDrive, an online storing service.

==== Microsoft Office 2013 ====
A technical preview of Microsoft Office 2013 (Build 15.0.3612.1010) was released on January 30, 2012, and a Customer Preview version was made available to consumers on July 16, 2012. It sports a revamped application interface; the interface is based on Metro, the interface of Windows Phone and Windows 8. Microsoft Outlook has received the most pronounced changes so far; for example, the Metro interface provides a new visualization for scheduled tasks. PowerPoint includes more templates and transition effects, and OneNote includes a new splash screen.

On May 16, 2011, new images of Office 15 were revealed, showing Excel with a tool for filtering data in a timeline, the ability to convert Roman numerals to Arabic numerals, and the integration of advanced trigonometric functions. In Word, the capability of inserting video and audio online as well as the broadcasting of documents on the Web were implemented. Microsoft has promised support for Office Open XML Strict starting with version 15, a format Microsoft has submitted to the ISO for interoperability with other office suites, and to aid adoption in the public sector. This version can read and write ODF 1.2 (Windows only).

On October 24, 2012, Office 2013 Professional Plus was released to manufacturing and was made available to TechNet and MSDN subscribers for download. On November 15, 2012, the 60-day trial version was released for public download. Office 2013 was released to general availability on January 29, 2013. Service Pack 1 for Office 2013 was released on February 25, 2014. Some applications were completely removed from the entire suite including SharePoint Workspace, Clip Organizer, and Office Picture Manager.

==== Microsoft Office 2016 ====
On January 22, 2015, the Microsoft Office blog announced that the next version of the suite for Windows desktop, Office 2016, was in development. On May 4, 2015, a public preview of Microsoft Office 2016 was released. Office 2016 was released for Mac OS X on July 9, 2015 and for Windows on September 22, 2015.

Users who had the Professional Plus 2016 subscription have the new Skype for Business app. Microsoft Teams, a team collaboration program meant to rival Slack, was released as a separate product for business and enterprise users.

==== Microsoft Office 2019 ====
On September 26, 2017, Microsoft announced that the next version of the suite for Windows desktop, Office 2019, was in development. On April 27, 2018, Microsoft released Office 2019 Commercial Preview for Windows 10. It was released to general availability for Windows 10 and for macOS on September 24, 2018.

==== Microsoft Office 2021 ====
On February 18, 2021, Microsoft announced that the next version of the suite for Windows desktop, Office 2021, was in development. This new version will be supported for five years and was released on October 5, 2021.

==== Microsoft Office 2024 ====
On November 14, 2023, Microsoft announced Office 2024, expected to be rolled out in the second half of 2024. The announcement was a reversal of their decision to discontinue the Office brand in January 2023. Like its predecessors, Office 2024 can be purchased under a perpetual license for the desktop. Office 2024 was released for customers under an LTSC contract on September 16, 2024. The consumer version of Office 2024 was released on October 1, 2024. Like its predecessors, Office 2024 is also available in a macOS variant.

=== Mac versions ===
Prior to packaging its various office-type Mac OS software applications into Office, Microsoft released Mac versions of Word 1.0 in 1984, the first year of the Macintosh computer; Excel 1.0 in 1985; and PowerPoint 1.0 in 1987. Microsoft does not include its Access database application in Office for Mac.

Microsoft has noted that some features are added to Office for Mac before they appear in Windows versions, such as Office for Mac 2001's Office Project Gallery and PowerPoint Movie feature, which allows users to save presentations as QuickTime movies. However, Microsoft Office for Mac has been long criticized for its lack of support of Unicode and for its lack of support for right-to-left languages, notably Arabic, Hebrew and Persian.

==== Early Office for Mac releases (1989–1994) ====
Microsoft Office for Mac was introduced for Mac OS in 1989, before Office was released for Windows. It included Word 4.0, Excel 2.2, PowerPoint 2.01, and Mail 1.37. It was originally a limited-time promotion but later became a regular product. With the release of Office on CD-ROM later that year, Microsoft became the first major Mac publisher to put its applications on CD-ROM.

Microsoft Office 1.5 for Mac was released in 1991 and included the updated Excel 3.0, the first application to support Apple's System 7 operating system.

Microsoft Office 3.0 for Mac was released in 1992 and included Word 5.0, Excel 4.0, PowerPoint 3.0 and Mail Client. Excel 4.0 was the first application to support new AppleScript.

Microsoft Office 4.2 for Mac was released in 1994. (Version 4.0 was skipped to synchronize version numbers with Office for Windows) Version 4.2 included Word 6.0, Excel 5.0, PowerPoint 4.0 and Mail 3.2. It was the first Office suite for Power Macintosh. Its user interface was identical to Office 4.2 for Windows leading many customers to comment that it wasn't Mac-like enough. The final release for Mac 68K was Office 4.2.1, which updated Word to version 6.0.1, somewhat improving performance.

==== Microsoft Office 98 Macintosh Edition ====
Microsoft Office 98 Macintosh Edition was unveiled at MacWorld Expo/San Francisco in 1998. It introduced the Internet Explorer 4.0 web browser and Outlook Express, an Internet e-mail client and usenet newsgroup reader. Office 98 was re-engineered by Microsoft's Macintosh Business Unit to satisfy customers' desire for software they felt was more Mac-like. It included drag–and-drop installation, self-repairing applications and Quick Thesaurus, before such features were available in Office for Windows. It also was the first version to support QuickTime movies.

==== Microsoft Office 2001 and v. X ====
Microsoft Office v. X box art

Microsoft Office 2001 was launched in 2000 as the last Office suite for the classic Mac OS. It required a PowerPC processor. This version introduced Entourage, an e-mail client that included information management tools such as a calendar, an address book, task lists and notes. Microsoft Office v. X was released in 2001 and was the first version of Microsoft Office for Mac OS X. Support for Office v. X ended on January 9, 2007, after the release of the final update, 10.1.9 Office v.X includes Word X, Excel X, PowerPoint X, Entourage X, MSN Messenger for Mac and Windows Media Player 9 for Mac; it was the last version of Office for Mac to include Internet Explorer for Mac.

==== Office 2004 ====
Microsoft Office 2004 for Mac was released on May 11, 2004. It includes Microsoft Word, Excel, PowerPoint, Entourage and Virtual PC. It is the final version of Office to be built exclusively for PowerPC and to officially support G3 processors, as its sequel lists a G4, G5, or Intel processor as a requirement. It was notable for supporting Visual Basic for Applications (VBA), which is unavailable in Office 2008. This led Microsoft to extend support for Office 2004 from October 13, 2009, to January 10, 2012. VBA functionality was reintroduced in Office 2011, which is only compatible with Intel processors.

==== Office 2008 ====
Microsoft Office 2008 for Mac was released on January 15, 2008. It was the only Office for Mac suite to be compiled as a universal binary, being the first to feature native Intel support and the last to feature PowerPC support for G4 and G5 processors, although the suite is unofficially compatible with G3 processors. New features include native Office Open XML file format support, which debuted in Office 2007 for Windows, and stronger Microsoft Office password protection employing AES-128 and SHA-1. Benchmarks suggested that compared to its predecessor, Office 2008 ran at similar speeds on Intel machines and slower speeds on PowerPC machines. Office 2008 also lacked Visual Basic for Applications (VBA) support, leaving it with only 15 months of additional mainstream support compared to its predecessor. Nevertheless, five months after it was released, Microsoft said that Office 2008 was "selling faster than any previous version of Office for Mac in the past 19 years" and affirmed "its commitment to future products for the Mac."

==== Office 2011 ====
Microsoft Office for Mac 2011 was released on October 26, 2010,. It is the first version of Office for Mac to be compiled exclusively for Intel processors, dropping support for the PowerPC architecture. It features an OS X version of Outlook to replace the Entourage email client. This version of Outlook is intended to make the OS X version of Office work better with Microsoft's Exchange server and with those using Office for Windows. Office 2011 includes a Mac-based Ribbon similar to Office for Windows.

==== OneNote and Outlook release (2014) ====
Microsoft OneNote for Mac was released on March 17, 2014. It marks the company's first release of the note-taking software on the Mac. It is available as a free download to all users of the Mac App Store in OS X Mavericks.

Microsoft Outlook 2016 for Mac debuted on October 31, 2014. It requires a paid Office 365 subscription, meaning that traditional Office 2011 retail or volume licenses cannot activate this version of Outlook. On that day, Microsoft confirmed that it would release the next version of Office for Mac in late 2015.

Despite dropping support for older versions of OS X and only keeping support for 64-bit-only versions of OS X, these versions of OneNote and Outlook are 32-bit applications like their predecessors.

==== Office 2016 ====
The first Preview version of Microsoft Office 2016 for Mac was released on March 5, 2015. On July 9, 2015, Microsoft released the final version of Microsoft Office 2016 for Mac which includes Word, Excel, PowerPoint, Outlook and OneNote. It was immediately made available for Office 365 subscribers with either a Home, Personal, Business, Business Premium, E3 or ProPlus subscription. A non–Office 365 edition of Office 2016 was made available as a one-time purchase option on September 22, 2015.

==== Office 2024 ====
Microsoft Office 2024 (Fourth perpetual release of Office 16) for the Microsoft Windows and MacOS was released on October 1, 2024.

=== Mobile versions ===
Office Hub on Android

Office Mobile for iPhone was released on June 14, 2013, in the United States. Support for 135 markets and 27 languages was rolled out over a few days. It requires iOS 8 or later. Although the app also works on iPad devices, excluding the first generation, it is designed for a small screen. Office Mobile was released for Android phones on July 31, 2013, in the United States. Support for 117 markets and 33 languages was added gradually over several weeks. It is supported on Android 4.0 and later.

Office Mobile is or was also available, though no longer supported, on Windows Mobile, Windows Phone and Symbian. Windows RT devices (such as Microsoft Surface) were bundled with "Office RT", a port of the PC version of Office 2013 to ARM architecture. The applications contain most of the functionality available in their versions for Intel-compatible PCs, but some features have been removed.

==== Early Office Mobile releases ====
Originally called Office Mobile which was shipped initially as "Pocket Office", was released by Microsoft with the Windows CE 1.0 operating system in 1996. This release was specifically for the Handheld PC hardware platform, as Windows Mobile Smartphone and Pocket PC hardware specifications had not yet been released. It consisted of Pocket Word and Pocket Excel; PowerPoint, Access, and Outlook were added later. With steady updates throughout subsequent releases of Windows Mobile, Office Mobile was rebranded as its current name after the release of the Windows Mobile 5.0 operating system. This release of Office Mobile also included PowerPoint Mobile for the first time. Accompanying the release of Microsoft OneNote 2007, a new optional addition to the Office Mobile line of programs was released as OneNote Mobile. With the release of Windows Mobile 6 Standard, Office Mobile became available for the Smartphone hardware platform, but unlike Office Mobile for the Professional and Classic versions of Windows Mobile, creation of new documents is not an added feature. A popular workaround is to create a new blank document in a desktop version of Office, synchronize it to the device, and then edit and save on the Windows Mobile device.

In June 2007, Microsoft announced a new version of the office suite, Office Mobile 2007. It became available as "Office Mobile 6.1" on September 26, 2007, as a free upgrade download to current Windows Mobile 5.0 and 6 users. However, "Office Mobile 6.1 Upgrade" is not compatible with Windows Mobile 5.0 powered devices running builds earlier than 14847. It is a pre-installed feature in subsequent releases of Windows Mobile 6 devices. Office Mobile 6.1 is compatible with the Office Open XML specification like its desktop counterpart.

On August 12, 2009, it was announced that Office Mobile would also be released for the Symbian platform as a joint agreement between Microsoft and Nokia. It was the first time Microsoft would develop Office mobile applications for another smartphone platform. The first application to appear on Nokia Eseries smartphones was Microsoft Office Communicator. In February 2012, Microsoft released OneNote, Lync 2010, Document Connection and PowerPoint Broadcast for Symbian. In April, Word Mobile, PowerPoint Mobile and Excel Mobile joined the Office Suite.

On October 21, 2010, Microsoft debuted Office Mobile 2010 with the release of Windows Phone 7. In Windows Phone, users can access and edit documents directly off of their SkyDrive or Office 365 accounts in a dedicated Office hub. The Office Hub, which is preinstalled into the operating system, contains Word, PowerPoint and Excel. The operating system also includes OneNote, although not as a part of the Office Hub. Lync is not included, but can be downloaded as standalone app from the Windows Phone Store free of charge.

In October 2012, Microsoft released a new version of Microsoft Office Mobile for Windows Phone 8 and Windows Phone 7.8.

==== Office for Android, iOS and Windows 10 Mobile ====
Office Mobile was released for iPhone on June 14, 2013, and for Android phones on July 31, 2013.

In March 2014, Microsoft released Office Lens, a scanner app that enhances photos. Photos are then attached to an Office document. Office Lens is an app in the Windows Phone store, as well as built into the camera functionality in the OneNote apps for iOS and Windows 8.

Word on an Android device

On March 27, 2014, Microsoft launched Office for iPad, the first dedicated version of Office for tablet computers. In addition, Microsoft made the Android and iOS versions of Office Mobile free for 'home use' on phones, although the company still requires an Office 365 subscription for using Office Mobile for business use. On November 6, 2014, Office was subsequently made free for personal use on the iPad in addition to phones. As part of this announcement, Microsoft also split up its single "Office suite" app on iPhones into separate, standalone apps for Word, Excel and PowerPoint, released a revamped version of Office Mobile for iPhone, added direct integration with Dropbox, and previewed future versions of Office for other platforms.

Office for Android tablets was released on January 29, 2015, following a successful two-month preview period. These apps allow users to edit and create documents for free on devices with screen sizes of 10.1 inches or less, though as with the iPad versions, an Office 365 subscription is required to unlock premium features and for commercial use of the apps. Tablets with screen sizes larger than 10.1 inches are also supported, but, as was originally the case with the iPad version, are restricted to viewing documents only unless a valid Office 365 subscription is used to enable editing and document creation.

On January 21, 2015, during the "Windows 10: The Next Chapter" press event, Microsoft unveiled Office for Windows 10, Windows Runtime ports of the Android and iOS versions of the Office Mobile suite. Optimized for smartphones and tablets, they are universal apps that can run on both Windows and Windows for phones, and share similar underlying code. A simplified version of Outlook was also added to the suite. They will be bundled with Windows 10 mobile devices, and available from the Windows Store for the PC version of Windows 10. Although the preview versions were free for most editing, the release versions will require an Office 365 subscription on larger tablets (screen size larger than 10.1 inches) and desktops for editing, as with large Android tablets. Smaller tablets and phones will have most editing features for free.

On June 24, 2015, Microsoft released Word, Excel and PowerPoint as standalone apps on Google Play for Android phones, following a one-month preview. These apps have also been bundled with Android devices from major OEMs, as a result of Microsoft tying distribution of them and Skype to patent-licensing agreements related to the Android platform. The Android version is also supported on certain ChromeOS machines.

On February 19, 2020, Microsoft announced a new unified Office mobile app for Android and iOS. This app combines Word, Excel, and PowerPoint into a single app and introduces new capabilities as making quick notes, signing PDFs, scanning QR codes, and transferring files.

=== Online versions ===
Office Web Apps was first revealed in October 2008 at PDC 2008 in Los Angeles. Chris Capossela, senior vice president of Microsoft business division, introduced Office Web Apps as lightweight versions of Word, Excel, PowerPoint and OneNote that allow people to create, edit and collaborate on Office documents through a web browser. According to Capossela, Office Web Apps was to become available as a part of Office Live Workspace. Office Web Apps was announced to be powered by AJAX as well as Silverlight; however, the latter is optional and its availability will only "enhance the user experience, resulting in sharper images and improved rendering." Microsoft's Business Division President Stephen Elop stated during PDC 2008 that "a technology preview of Office Web Apps would become available later in 2008". However, the Technical Preview of Office Web Apps was not released until 2009.

On July 13, 2009, Microsoft announced at its Worldwide Partners Conference 2009 in New Orleans that Microsoft Office 2010 reached its "Technical Preview" development milestone and features of Office Web Apps were demonstrated to the public for the first time. Additionally, Microsoft announced that Office Web Apps would be made available to consumers online and free of charge, while Microsoft Software Assurance customers will have the option of running them on premises. Office 2010 beta testers were not given access to Office Web Apps at this date, and it was announced that it would be available for testers during August 2009. However, in August 2009, a Microsoft spokesperson stated that there had been a delay in the release of Office Web Apps Technical Preview and it would not be available by the end of August.

Microsoft officially released the Technical Preview of Office Web Apps on September 17, 2009. Office Web Apps was made available to selected testers via its OneDrive (at the time Skydrive) service. The final version of Office Web Apps was made available to the public via Windows Live Office on June 7, 2010.

On October 22, 2012, Microsoft announced the release of new features including co-authoring, performance improvements and touch support.

On November 6, 2013, Microsoft announced further new features including real-time co-authoring and an Auto-Save feature in Word (replacing the save button).

In February 2014, Office Web Apps were re-branded Office Online and incorporated into other Microsoft web services, including Calendar, OneDrive, Outlook.com, and People. Microsoft had previously attempted to unify its online services suite (including Microsoft Passport, Hotmail, MSN Messenger, and later SkyDrive) under a brand known as Windows Live, first launched in 2005. However, with the impending launch of Windows 8 and its increased use of cloud services, Microsoft dropped the Windows Live brand to emphasize that these services would now be built directly into Windows and not merely be a "bolted on" add-on. Critics had criticized the Windows Live brand for having no clear vision, as it was being applied to an increasingly broad array of unrelated services. At the same time, Windows Live Hotmail was re-launched as Outlook.com (sharing its name with the Microsoft Outlook personal information manager).

In July 2019, Microsoft announced that they were retiring the "Online" branding for Office Online. The product is now Office, and may be referred to as "Office for the web" or "Office in a browser".

== Logo history ==
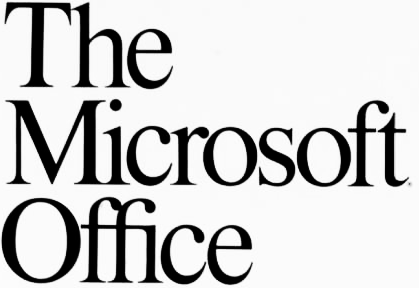
1990

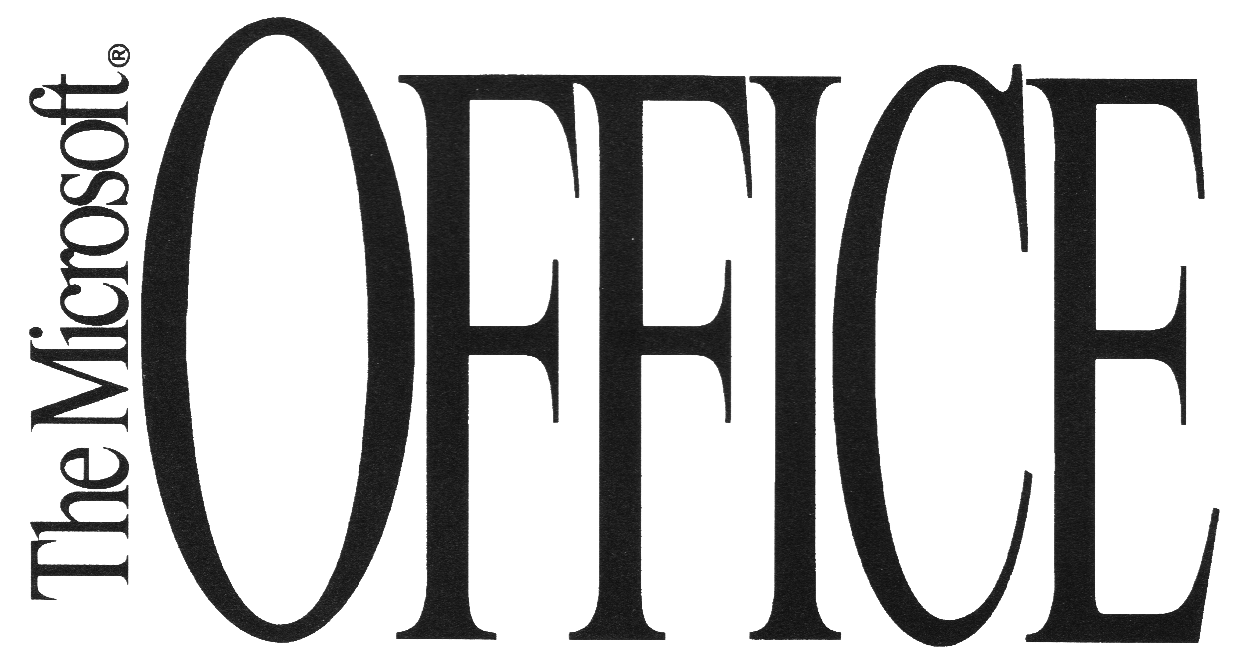
1992

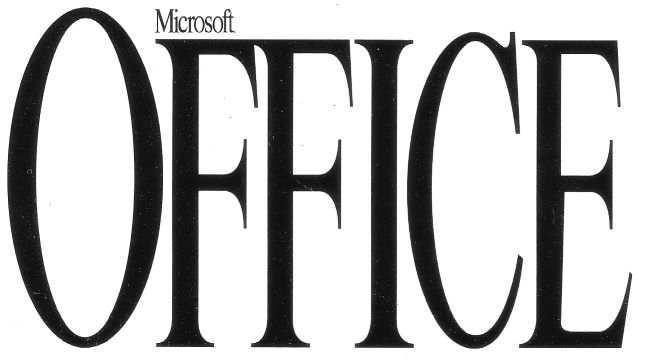
1994

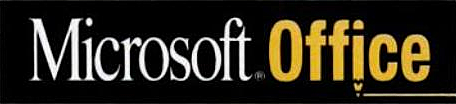
1994 (variant)

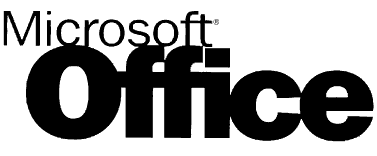
1995

2003

2007

2013

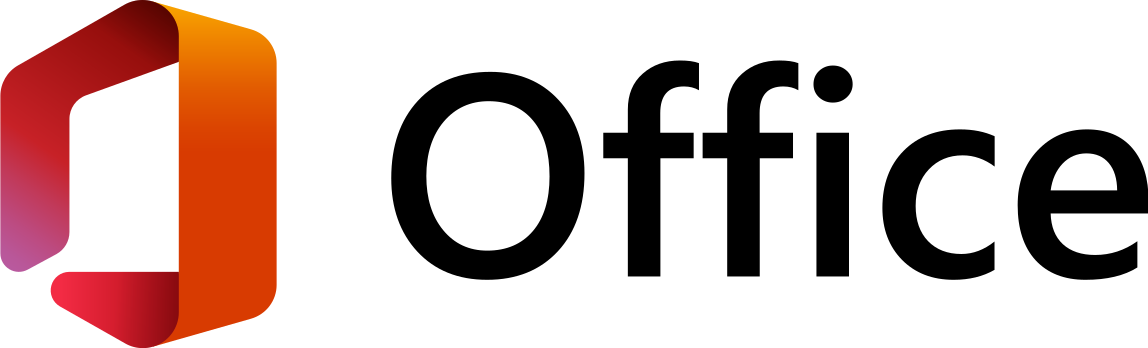
2019

== See also ==
- Comparison of office suites
- List of office suites
- Microsoft Azure
- Microsoft Dynamics 365
- Microsoft Power Platform
- Microsoft Works
- List of Microsoft software
- Google Workspace
- LibreOffice
