= Microsoft SharePoint Workspace =

Document collaboration software

- The Workspaces view of SharePoint Workspace 2010
- Developer: Microsoft
- Release: June 15, 2010; 16 years ago
- Stable release: 14.0.7265.5000 / February 9, 2021; 5 years ago
- Operating system: Windows XP SP3 and later Windows Server 2003 SP2 and later
- Platform: IA-32 and x64
- Successor: Microsoft OneDrive
- Type: Collaborative software
- License: Trialware
- Website: office.com/sharepoint-workspace/

Microsoft SharePoint Workspace (formerly Microsoft Office Groove) is a discontinued desktop application designed for document collaboration in teams with members who are regularly off-line or who do not share the same network security clearance. It is no longer included with Microsoft Office 2013. It has been replaced by a web-based service called OneDrive for Business.

Groove's uses have included coordination between emergency relief agencies, where different organizations do not share a common security infrastructure and where offline access is important, and amongst teams of knowledge workers, such as consultants who need to work securely on client sites. It is also used as a staging system for documents in development, where content can be developed then transferred to a portal when complete.

Groove was initially developed by Lotus Notes creator Ray Ozzie, and developed by Groove Networks of Beverly, Massachusetts, until Microsoft's acquisition of Groove Networks in March 2005.

== Collaboration tools ==
Groove's basic set of services (including always-on security, persistent chat, store-and-forward messaging delivery, firewall/NAT transparency, ad-hoc group formation, and change notification) may be customized with tools.

Tools are mini-applications that rely on Groove's underlying functionality to disseminate and synchronize their contents with other members' copies of the workspace. Groove provides various tools that can be added to (and removed from) a workspace to customize the functionality of each space (for example a calendar, discussion, file sharing, an outliner, pictures, notepad, sketchpad, web browser, etc.). Tools that members use in a workspace often drive the nature of the person-to-person collaboration that ensues. In Groove 2007, the SharePoint Files tools can be used to take SharePoint 2007 document libraries offline.

Groove 2007 includes a presence subsystem, which keeps track of which users in the contact store are online, and presents the information in the launchbar. If Groove server is used, a user is considered online when they log on to the server. In absence of a server, the Device Presence Protocol (which comes in different variants for LANs and WANs) is used. Groove also allows sending instant messages to peers. All session and user information is stored by the Groove client at client side.

== Versions ==
Groove Virtual Office 3.1 was the last version before Microsoft's acquisition of Groove Networks. The following versions have been released since:

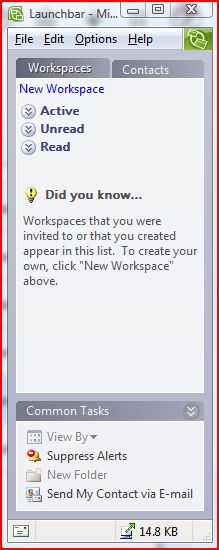
Groove 2007

- Groove 2007 (Included in Office 2007 Ultimate and Enterprise editions and also available as a separate product), released January 27, 2007.
- SharePoint Workspace 2010, released July 15, 2010.

Microsoft claims the name change is a natural progression, since Groove is to SharePoint what Outlook is to Exchange. Microsoft asserts that features have been added to make it easier to deploy and manage, and claims that SharePoint Workspace will make it easier to access SharePoint content (or content from any server that implements the publicly documented protocols).

== Server application ==
Microsoft Groove Server is a tool for centrally managing all deployments of Microsoft SharePoint Workspace in an enterprise. It enables using Active Directory for Groove user accounts, and create Groove Domains, with individual policy settings.

== See also ==
- Comparison of office suites
- Collaborative software
