= Skype for Business =

Enterprise instant messaging and video conferencing software by Microsoft

- Skype for Business
- Developer: Microsoft
- Stable release: 16.0.15601.20578 / March 3, 2023; 3 years ago
- Operating system: Windows, macOS, Android and iOS
- Successor: Microsoft Teams
- Type: Audio, Video, Instant Messaging
- Website: www.skype.com/en/business

Skype for Business (formerly Microsoft Lync and Office Communicator) is a discontinued enterprise software application for instant messaging and videotelephony developed by Microsoft as part of the Microsoft 365 (formerly Office) suite. It was designed for use with the on-premises Skype for Business Server software, and a software as a service version offered as part of 365. Skype for Business supported text, audio, and video chat, and integrates with Microsoft 365 components such as Exchange and SharePoint.

The software was previously named Lync before rebranding to Skype for Business in 2015, co-branding it with the Microsoft-owned consumer messaging platform Skype (which had begun to integrate with Lync in 2013). Despite the same branding, Skype for Business and Skype have almost nothing in common and function as separate platforms.

In September 2017, Microsoft announced that it would phase out Skype for Business Online in favor of Microsoft Teams, a new cloud-based collaboration platform.

The end-of-life (EOL) date for Skype for Business Online was July 2021, with (paid) support extended until October 2029, at which time the platform will remain available for existing users, but without patches and security updates. Skype for Business Server is available with a subscription license.

== History ==
Microsoft released Office Communicator 2007 to production on July 28, 2007, and launched it on October 27, 2007. It was followed by Office Communicator 2007 R2, released on March 19, 2009. Microsoft released the successor to Office Communicator, Lync 2010, on January 25, 2010. In November 2010, the platform was renamed Lync.

Microsoft Lync logo (2013 version)

In May 2013, Microsoft announced that it would allow Lync users to communicate with Skype, a consumer IM platform it had acquired in 2011. This initially included support for text and voice communications. On November 11, 2014, Microsoft announced that Lync would be renamed Skype for Business in 2015, also adding support for video calls with Skype users.

On September 22, 2015, Skype for Business 2016 was released alongside Office 2016. On October 27, 2016, the Skype for Business for Mac client was released.

On September 25, 2017, Microsoft announced that Skype for Business Online would be discontinued in the future in favor of Microsoft Teams, a cloud-based collaboration platform for corporate groups (comparable to Slack) integrating persistent messaging, video conferencing, file storage, and application integration. Microsoft released a final on-premises version of Skype for Business Server as part of Office 2019 in late 2018, and announced in July 2019 that the hosted Skype for Business Online will cease functioning on July 31, 2021. Since September 2019, Skype for Business Online is no longer offered to new Microsoft 365 subscribers, and they are directed to Microsoft Teams instead. The next version of Skype for Business Server will be available with a subscription license.

== Versions ==
- Exchange 2000 Conferencing
- Windows Messenger 5.0 (Live Communications Server 2003)
- Windows Messenger 5.1 and Microsoft Office Communicator 2005 (Live Communications Server 2005)
- Office Communicator 2007
- Office Communicator 2007 R2
- Lync 2010
- Lync 2013
- Skype for Businesses 2015
- Skype for Businesses 2016
- Skype for Businesses 2019
- Skype for Business for Microsoft 365

== Features ==
The Basic features of Skype for Business include:

- Instant messaging (IM)
- Audio calls
- Video calls
- Desktop sharing

Advanced features relate to integration with other Microsoft software:

- Availability of contacts based on Microsoft Outlook contacts stored in a Microsoft Exchange Server
- Users can retrieve contact lists from a local directory service such as Microsoft Exchange Server
- Microsoft Office can show if other people are working on the same document
- All communication between the clients takes place through a Skype for Business Server. This makes communications more secure, as messages do not need to leave the corporate intranet, unlike with the Internet-based Windows Live Messenger. The server can be set to relay messages to other instant messaging networks, avoiding installation of extra software at the client side.
- A number of client types are available for Microsoft Skype for Business, including mobile clients.
- Uses SIP as the basis for its client communication protocol
- Offers support for TLS and SRTP to encrypt and secure signaling and media traffic
- Allows sharing files

Note: With the release of Lync Server 2013 in October 2012, a new collaboration feature "Persistent Group Chat" which allows multi-party chat with preservation of content between chat sessions was introduced. However, only the native Windows OS client and no other platform supports this feature at this time. The main new features of this version are the addition of real-time multi-client collaborative software capabilities, (which allow teams of people to see and simultaneously work on the same documents and communications session). Lync and Skype for Business implement these features as follows:

- Collaboration through Whiteboard documents, where the participants have freedom to share text, drawing and graphical annotations.
- Collaboration through PowerPoint documents, where the participants can control and see presentations, as well as allow everybody to add text, drawing and graphical annotations.
- Polling lists, where Presenters can organize polls and all participants can vote and see results.
- Desktop sharing, usually by allowing participants to see and collaborate on a Windows screen
- Windows applications sharing, by allowing participants to see and collaborate on a specific application.

All collaboration sessions get automatically defined as conferences, where clients can invite more contacts. Conference initiators (usually called "organizers") can either promote participants to act as presenters or demote them to act as attendees. They can also define some basic policies about what presenters and attendees can see and do. Deeper details of policy permissions are defined at server level.

Following Microsoft's acquisition of Skype in May 2011, the Lync and Skype platforms could be connected, but sometimes only after lengthy provisioning time.

=== Extensions ===
Skype for Business uses a number of extensions to the SIP/SIMPLE instant-messaging protocol for some features. As with most instant-messaging platforms, non-Microsoft instant-messaging clients that have not implemented these publicly available extensions may not work correctly or have complete functionality. Skype for Business supports federated presence and IM to other popular instant message services such as AOL, Yahoo, MSN, and any service using the XMPP protocol, although support for XMPP has been deprecated in Skype for Business 2019. Text instant-messaging in a web browser is available via Skype for Business integration within Exchange Outlook Web App.

Although other IM protocols such as AIM and Yahoo! do have wider support by third-party clients, these protocols have been largely reverse-engineered by outside developers. Microsoft does offer details of its extensions on MSDN and provides an API kit to help developers build platforms that can interoperate with Skype for Business Server and clients.

== Clients ==
As of May 2018, the following Skype for Business clients are available:

- Windows (Pro and Enterprise only, can download free Skype for Business Basic client) and macOS (included with Microsoft 365)
- Linux (provided by TEL.RED)
- iOS (Microsoft app in App Store; alternative client provided by TEL.RED)
- Android (Microsoft app in Google Play; alternative client provided by TEL.RED)

Windows Phone and Windows 10 Mobile apps were discontinued by Microsoft in May 2018.

== See also ==
Similar discontinued Microsoft products

- Windows Meeting Space
- Microsoft NetMeeting
- Microsoft Office Live Meeting

Others

- Comparison of web conferencing software
- Innovative Communications Alliance
