= Microsoft Office 98 Macintosh Edition =

Version of Microsoft Office

- The box for Microsoft Office 98 Macintosh Edition
- Developer: Microsoft
- Release: April 1998; 28 years ago
- Final release: Service Release 5 / November 29, 2002; 23 years ago
- Operating system: Classic Mac OS
- Type: Office suite
- License: Commercial Proprietary software

Microsoft Office 98 Macintosh Edition is a version of Microsoft Office for the classic Mac OS, unveiled at Macworld Expo/San Francisco on January 6, 1998. It introduced the Internet Explorer 4.0 browser and Outlook Express, an Internet e-mail client and usenet newsgroup reader. Office 98 was re-engineered by Microsoft's Macintosh Business Unit to satisfy customers' desire for more Mac-like software.

There are two editions of Office 98: Gold and Standard.

It included drag-and-drop installation, self-repairing applications and Quick Thesaurus, before such features were available in a version of Office for Windows. It also was the first version to support QuickTime movies. The applications in Microsoft Office 98 were:

- Microsoft PowerPoint 98
- Microsoft Word 98.
- Microsoft Excel 98
- Outlook Express 4.0
- Internet Explorer 4.0

Another rare edition of Microsoft Office 98 Macintosh Edition was published titled: "Microsoft Office 98 Macintosh Gold Edition." This version included everything the normal version included plus Microsoft FrontPage Version 1.0 for Macintosh, Microsoft Bookshelf 98 reference software, and Microsoft Encarta 98 Macintosh Deluxe Edition.

== History and development ==
Office 98 was developed by Microsoft's Macintosh Business Unit (MacBU) as part of an effort to deliver more "Mac-like" software after criticism that earlier releases - particularly Office 4.x - felt too closely modeled on the Windows interface.

== Service releases ==
Office 98 Mac service releases
Release date	Version
December 12, 1998	SR-1
March 11, 1999	SR-1.5
June 14, 1999	SR-1.9
February 17, 2000	SR-2
September 14, 2000	SR-2.5
June 15, 2001	SR-3
May 17, 2002	SR-4
November 29, 2002	SR-5

== System requirements ==
- A Mac OS-compatible computer equipped with a PowerPC processor.
- System 7.5 through Mac OS X 10.2.8 (unofficially up to 10.4.11) with Classic Environment.
- At least 16 MB of physical RAM to run one application, 32 MB recommended to run multiple applications.
- Sufficient hard disk space, depending on installation method: 'Drag and drop' or 'Easy' (90 MB), 'Complete' (min. 43 MB to max. 110 MB) or 'Run from CD or Run from network' (7 MB on the client hard disk).
- One CD-ROM drive.
- An 8-bit color or 4-bit grayscale display with at least 640 × 400 resolution.

Sources of above.
