= Apple Productivity Experience Group =

Operating unit of Microsoft

- Company type: Operating unit of Microsoft
- Industry: Computer software
- Founded: January 7, 1997
- Headquarters: Redmond, Washington, United States
- Products: Microsoft Office; Microsoft Messenger; Remote Desktop Client
- Revenue: $350 million (2008)
- Number of employees: 180 (2008)
- Website: www.microsoft.com/mac/

Apple Productivity Experience Group (known as APEX) is an operating unit of Microsoft that, as of 2009, is the largest software developer outside of Apple Inc. for the macOS and iOS operating systems. Formed as Macintosh Business Unit on January 7, 1997, it was initially composed of over 100 individuals from the existing cross platform Word, Excel, and PowerPoint teams in Microsoft's Office Division, and grew to 180 people the next year, with the addition of the Internet Explorer for Mac and Outlook Express for Mac teams. In 2000, it moved from the Office Division to the Specialized Devices and Applications Group inside the Entertainment and Devices Division, and is now back inside the Microsoft Office division.

== History ==
Prior to the creation of the Mac BU, Microsoft had developed Macintosh software, starting in 1984 with Word 1.0 for Macintosh. During the early and mid 1990s, Microsoft's Word, Excel, and Powerpoint teams simultaneously developed Windows and Macintosh versions of these applications, but after releasing Office 97 for Windows, Microsoft decided, in January 1997, to form a separate Macintosh Business Unit to focus on creating applications optimized for the Macintosh platform. In August 1997, as part of a broader partnership agreement with Apple, Microsoft committed to continue developing and supporting Macintosh software for at least 5 more years, renewing this pledge on January 10, 2006, at the Macworld Conference & Expo. Ben Waldman was the Mac BU's founder and first General Manager (GM), serving from its inception in January 1997 through January 2000, when he was succeeded by Kevin Browne, who served through December 18, 2002, and Roz Ho, who served from December 18, 2002, to June 8, 2007; after that, Craig Eisler became the GM. In October 2008, Eisler was tapped by Robbie Bach to lead all Entertainment Client efforts, and Eric Wilfred became the GM of MacBU.

== Software ==
APEX develops macOS and iOS versions of Microsoft Office and OneNote. Previously developed software by the Mac BU include Internet Explorer (development ceased in 2003), Virtual PC, and the MSN for Mac OS X browser (cancelled May 31, 2005).
