= Microsoft Publisher =

Desktop publishing software

- Microsoft Publisher 2021 running on Windows 11
- Developer: Microsoft
- Release: 1991; 35 years ago

Final release(s)
- Office 2024 (LTSC): 2408 (Build 17932.21140) / 10 November 2026; 9 days ago
- Office 2021 (LTSC): 2108 (Build 14334.21048) / 10 November 2026; 9 days ago
- Office 2019 (LTSC): 1808 (Build 10417.20236) / 10 November 2026; 9 days ago
- Office 2024 (Retail): 2611 (Build 20625.20108) / 17 November 2026; 2 days ago
- Office 2021 (Retail): 2611 (Build 20625.20108) / 17 November 2026; 2 days ago
- Office 2019 (Retail): 2509 (Build 19231.20194) / 14 October 2025; 13 months ago
- Operating system: Microsoft Windows
- Type: Desktop publishing software
- License: Trialware
- Website: products.office.com/publisher

Microsoft Publisher is a discontinued desktop publishing application from Microsoft, differing from Microsoft Word in that the emphasis was placed on page layout and graphic design rather than text composition and proofreading. It was discontinued on October 13, 2026.

== Overview ==
Publisher was included in higher-end editions of Microsoft Office, reflecting Microsoft's emphasis on the application as an easy-to-use and less expensive alternative to the "heavyweights" with a focus on the small-business market, where firms did not have dedicated design professionals available to make marketing materials and other documents. However, it maintained a relatively small share of the desktop publishing market, which was dominated by Adobe InDesign and formerly by QuarkXPress.

While most Microsoft Office apps adopted ribbons for their user interface starting with Microsoft Office 2007, Publisher retained its toolbars and did not acquire ribbons until Microsoft Office 2010.

=== Discontinuation ===
On February 15, 2024, Microsoft announced that Publisher would be discontinued on October 13, 2026. Microsoft began removing Publisher from Microsoft 365 on October 1, 2026, with availability ending as the removal updates rolled out. Support for perpetual-license versions of Publisher 2021 ended on October 13, 2026, although existing perpetual installations could continue to be used after that date. This date marked the end of Publisher as a standalone Microsoft program since its initial release in 1991.

== Cross-compatibility ==
Several applications could import Publisher's proprietary file format (.pub) for editing with some success, including Collabora Online, LibreOffice, and Scribus. Another option was to save the document as a separate EPS file for each individual page in the publication, and to then open the EPS files in the aforementioned applications or other applications.

Publisher supported some other file formats, including Microsoft's Enhanced Metafile (EMF) format, which was supported on Windows platforms. The Microsoft Publisher trial version could be used to view .pub files beyond the trial period.

Aldus (later Adobe) PageMaker also saved files with a .pub extension, but the two file formats were unrelated and incompatible.

== Release history ==
Name	Version number	Release date	Editions of Microsoft Office included in
Microsoft Publisher	1.0	Late 1991 (approx.)	—N/a
Microsoft Publisher	2.0	Jul 12, 1993	—N/a
Publisher for Windows 95 (beginning to transition to 32-bit)	3.0	Aug 24, 1995	—N/a
Microsoft Publisher 97	4.0	Oct 21, 1996	Small Business Edition
Microsoft Publisher 98 (first fully 32-bit)	5.0	Mar 23, 1998	Small Business Edition 2.0
Microsoft Publisher 2000	6.0	Jun 7, 1999	Small Business Edition, Professional, Premium, Developer
Microsoft Publisher 2002	10.0 (Note: Starting with Publisher 2002, the version number jumps to 10.0 to tally Microsoft Office versions.)	May 31, 2001	Professional OEM, Professional Special Edition
Microsoft Publisher 2003	11.0	Oct 21, 2003	Small Business, Professional, Professional Plus, Enterprise
Microsoft Publisher 2007	12.0	Jan 30, 2007	Small Business, Professional, Ultimate, Professional Plus, Enterprise
Microsoft Publisher 2010	14.0 (Note: Version 13 was skipped due to the superstition attached to the number 13.)	Jun 15, 2010	Standard, Professional, Professional Plus
Microsoft Publisher 2013	15.0	Jan 29, 2013	Professional, Professional Plus, Standard (volume licensing), all Office 365 / Microsoft 365 Apps editions
Microsoft Publisher 2016	16.0	Sep 22, 2015	Professional, Professional Plus, Standard (volume licensing), all Office 365 / Microsoft 365 Apps editions
Microsoft Publisher 2019	16.0	Sep 24, 2018	Professional, Professional Plus, Standard (volume licensing), all Office 365 / Microsoft 365 Apps editions
Microsoft Publisher 2021	16.0	October 5, 2021	Microsoft 365 Apps for business and Business Standard editions

== See also ==
- Comparison of desktop publishing software
- List of desktop publishing software
