= List of mergers and acquisitions by Microsoft =

Microsoft logo

Microsoft is an American public multinational corporation headquartered in Redmond, Washington, USA that develops, manufactures, licenses, and supports a wide range of products and services predominantly related to computing through its various product divisions. Established on April 4, 1975, to develop and sell BASIC interpreters for the Altair 8800, Microsoft rose to dominate the home computer operating system market with MS-DOS in the mid-1980s, followed by the Microsoft Windows line of operating systems. Microsoft would also come to dominate the office suite market with Microsoft Office. The company has diversified in recent years into the video game industry with the Xbox, the Xbox 360, the Xbox One, and the Xbox Series X/S as well as into the consumer electronics and digital services market with Zune, MSN and the Windows Phone OS.

The company's initial public offering was held on March 14, 1986. The stock, which eventually closed at $27.75 a share, peaked at $29.25 a share shortly after the market opened for trading. After the offering, Microsoft had a market capitalization of $519.777 million. Microsoft has subsequently acquired over 225 companies, purchased stakes in 64 companies, and made 25 divestments. Of the companies that Microsoft has acquired, 107 were based in the United States. Microsoft has not released financial details for most of these mergers and acquisitions.

Since Microsoft's first acquisition in 1986, it has purchased an average of six companies a year. The company purchased more than ten companies a year between 2005 and 2008, and it acquired 18 firms in 2006, the most in a single year, including Onfolio, Lionhead Studios, Massive Incorporated, ProClarity, Winternals Software, and Colloquis. Microsoft has made fourteen acquisitions worth over one billion dollars: Skype Technologies (2011), aQuantive (2007), Fast Search & Transfer (2008), Navision (2002), Visio Corporation (2000), Yammer (2012), Nokia's mobile and devices division (2013), Mojang (2014), LinkedIn (2016), GitHub (2018), Affirmed Networks (2020), ZeniMax Media (2020), Nuance Communications (2021), and Activision Blizzard (2022).

Microsoft has also purchased several stakes valued at more than a billion dollars. It obtained an 11.5% stake in Comcast for $1 billion, a 22.98% stake in Telewest for $2.263 billion, and a 3% stake in AT&T for $5 billion. Among Microsoft's divestments, in which parts of the company are sold to another company, only Expedia Group was sold for more than a billion dollars; USA Networks purchased the company on February 5, 2002, for $1.372 billion (~$2.34 billion in 2025).

== Key acquisitions ==
Microsoft's first acquisition was Dynamical Systems Research (DSR) on June 20, 1986. DSR developed a clone of IBM's TopView operating environment for DOS; Microsoft employed their technology and programmers to further the development of Windows. Its second acquisition was Forethought on July 30, 1987. Forethought was founded in 1983 and developed a presentation program that would later be known as Microsoft PowerPoint.

On December 31, 1997, Microsoft acquired Hotmail.com for $500 million (~$930 million in 2025), its largest acquisition at the time, and integrated Hotmail into its MSN group of services. Hotmail, a free webmail service founded in 1996 by Jack Smith and Sabeer Bhatia, had more than 8.5 million subscribers earlier that month.

In 1999, Microsoft reportedly discussed a buyout of Nintendo. However, execs failed to negotiate a deal, with Xbox co-inventor Kevin Bachus explaining "They just laughed their asses off."

Microsoft acquired Seattle-based Visio Corporation on January 7, 2000, for $1.375 billion (~$2.44 billion in 2025). Visio, a software company, was founded in 1990 as Axon Corporation, and had its initial public offering in November 1995. The company developed the diagramming application software, Visio, which was integrated into Microsoft's product line as Microsoft Visio after its acquisition.

On July 12, 2002, Microsoft purchased Navision for $1.33 billion (~$2.27 billion in 2025). The company, which developed the technology for the Microsoft Dynamics NAV enterprise resource planning software, was integrated into Microsoft as a new division named Microsoft Business Solutions, later renamed to Microsoft Dynamics.

Microsoft purchased aQuantive, an advertising company, on August 13, 2007, for $6.333 billion (~$9.46 billion in 2025). Before the acquisition, aQuantive was ranked 14th in terms of revenue among advertising agencies worldwide. aQuantive had three subsidiaries at the time of the acquisition: Avenue A/Razorfish, one of the world's largest digital agencies, Atlas Solutions, and DRIVE Performance Solutions.

Microsoft acquired the Norwegian enterprise search company Fast Search & Transfer on April 25, 2008, for $1.191 billion (~$1.75 billion in 2025) to boost its search technology.

On May 10, 2011, Microsoft announced its acquisition of Skype Technologies, creator of the VoIP service Skype, for $8.5 billion (~$12 billion in 2025). With a value 32 times larger than Skype's operating profits, the deal was Microsoft's largest acquisition at the time. Skype would become a division within Microsoft, with Skype's former CEO Tony Bates —then the division's first president —reporting to the CEO of Microsoft.

On September 2, 2013, Microsoft announced its intent to acquire the mobile hardware division of Nokia (which had established a long-term partnership with Microsoft to produce smartphones built off its Windows Phone platform) in a deal worth 3.79 billion euros, along with another 1.65 billion to license Nokia's portfolio of patents. Steve Ballmer considered the purchase to be a "bold step into the future" for both companies, primarily as a result of its recent collaborations. The acquisition, scheduled to close in early 2014 pending regulatory approval, did not include the Here mapping service or the infrastructure division Nokia Solutions and Networks, which will be retained by Nokia. While the deal went through, in May 2016 Microsoft abandoned its mobile business and sold the Nokia feature phone line.

In September 2014, Microsoft purchased Mojang for $2.5 billion (~3.4 billion in June 2025).

On June 13, 2016, Microsoft announced it planned to acquire the professional networking site LinkedIn for $26.2 billion, to be completed by the end of 2016. The acquisition would keep LinkedIn as a distinct brand and retain its current CEO, Jeff Weiner, who will subsequently report to Microsoft CEO Satya Nadella. The acquisition was completed on December 8, 2016.

On June 4, 2018, Microsoft acquired the popular code repository site GitHub for $7.5 billion (~$9.46 billion in 2025) in Microsoft stock.

On September 21, 2020, Microsoft announced its intent to acquire ZeniMax Media and all its subsidiaries for $7.5 billion (~$9.18 billion in 2025). The acquisition was completed on March 9, 2021.

On January 18, 2022, Microsoft acquired Activision Blizzard, an American video game holding company, for $68.7 billion in cash. The deal was finalized on October 13, 2023, with the total cost of the acquisition amounting to $75.4 billion, following international government regulatory review of the action.

== Acquisitions ==
	Date	Company	Business	Country	Value (USD)	Adjusted (USD)	Ref(s).
1	June 20, 1986	Dynamical Systems Research	Operating systems	United States	1,500,000	4,000,000	
2	July 30, 1987	Forethought, Inc.	Computer software	United States	14,000,000	40,000,000	
3	March 31, 1991	Consumers Software	Software	Canada	—	—	
4	June 29, 1992	Fox Software	PC database software	United States	174,000,000	399,000,000	
5	February 28, 1994	Softimage	Wholesale 3-D visualization software	Canada	130,000,000	282,000,000	
6	September 27, 1994	Altamira Software	Software	United States	—	—	
7	November 1, 1994	NextBase	Software	United Kingdom	—	—	
8	November 15, 1994	One Tree Software	Software	United States	—	—	
9	February 23, 1995	RenderMorphics	3D graphics hardware	United States	—	—	
10	July 10, 1995	Network Managers	Systems design	United Kingdom	—	—	
11	October 17, 1995	The Blue Ribbon SoundWorks	Software	United States	—	—	
12	November 6, 1995	Netwise	Computer software	United States	—	—	
13	December 12, 1995	Bruce Artwick Organization	Programming	United States	—	—	
14	January 16, 1996	Vermeer Technologies	Software	United States	133,000,000	273,000,000	
15	March 6, 1996	VGA-Animation Software Div (Note: VGA-Animation Software Div was acquired from VGA.)	Software	Germany	—	—	
16	March 12, 1996	Colusa Software	Software	United States	—	—	
17	April 16, 1996	Exos	Video game controllers	United States	—	—	
18	April 23, 1996	Aspect Software Engineering	Computer software	United States	14,150,000	29,000,000	
19	June 11, 1996	eShop Inc.	Software	United States	50,000,000	103,000,000	
20	June 17, 1996	Electric Gravity	Electronic games	United States	—	—	
21	November 1, 1996	Panorama Software Sys-On-Line (Note: Panorama Software Sys-On-Line was acquired from Panorama Software.)	Software	Canada	—	—	
22	February 3, 1997	NetCarta	Internet software	United States	20,000,000	40,000,000	
23	March 3, 1997	Interse	Internet software	United States	—	—	
24	April 30, 1997	WebTV Networks	Internet service provider	United States	425,000,000	852,000,000	
25	May 7, 1997	Dimension X	Java-based platforms	United States	—	—	
26	June 13, 1997	Cooper & Peters	Programming	United States	—	—	
27	June 30, 1997	LinkAge Software	Internet software development	Canada	—	—	
28	August 5, 1997	VXtreme	Internet video software	United States	—	—	
29	December 31, 1997	Hotmail	Internet software	United States	500,000,000	1.003×10^{9}	
30	February 23, 1998	Flash Communications	Enterprise instant messaging software	United States	—	—	
31	April 15, 1998	Firefly	Relationship management software	United States	40,000,000	79,000,000	
32	April 28, 1998	MESA Group	Data sharing software	United States	—	—	
33	August 25, 1998	Valence Research	Internet software	United States	—	—	
34	November 6, 1998	LinkExchange	Internet advertising network	United States	265,000,000	523,000,000	
35	January 11, 1999	Virtual World Entertainment Group	Video games	United States	—	—	
36	March 4, 1999	CompareNet	Shopping online	United States	—	—	
37	March 26, 1999	Numinous Technologies	Software	United States	—	—	
38	April 19, 1999	Access Software	Video games	United States	—	—	
39	April 27, 1999	Interactive Objects-Digital	Web music software	United States	—	—	
40	April 30, 1999	Jump Networks	Internet service provider	United States	—	—	
41	June 7, 1999	ShadowFactor Software	Wholesale computer software	United States	—	—	
42	June 15, 1999	Omnibrowse	Internet software	United States	—	—	
43	June 28, 1999	Intrinsa	Defect detection software	United States	58,900,000	114,000,000	
44	July 1, 1999	Sendit	Application software	Sweden	125,420,000	242,000,000	
45	July 7, 1999	Zoomit	Encryption software	Canada	—	—	
46	July 21, 1999	STNC	Community software	United Kingdom	—	—	
47	September 19, 1999	Softway Systems	Computer programming	United States	—	—	
48	October 29, 1999	Entropic	Software	United States	—	—	
49	January 7, 2000	Visio Corporation	Wholesale drawing software	United States	1,375,000,000	2.571×10^{9}	
50	February 29, 2000	Peach Networks	Digital TV services	Israel	—	—	
51	March 17, 2000	Travelscape	Internet service provider	United States	89,750,000	168,000,000	
52	April 12, 2000	Titus Communications	Cable television	United States	944,800,000	1.766×10^{9}	
53	June 19, 2000	Bungie	Video games	United States	—	—	
54	July 12, 2000	NetGames	Software	United States	—	—	
55	September 13, 2000	MongoMusic	Online music search engine	United States	65,000,000	122,000,000	
56	September 27, 2000	Pacific Microsonics	Digital audio technology	United States	—	—	
57	December 5, 2000	Digital Anvil	Video games	United States	—	—	
58	March 17, 2001	Vacationspot	Internet service provider	United States	70,850,000	129,000,000	
59	April 5, 2001	Great Plains Software	Business management software	United States	939,884,000	1.709×10^{9}	
60	May 2, 2001	Intellisol International	Software	Canada	—	—	
61	May 3, 2001	Ensemble Studios	Video games	United States	100,000,000	182,000,000	
62	May 31, 2001	NCompass Labs	Internet software	Canada	36,000,000	65,000,000	
63	June 21, 2001	Maximal Innovative Intelligence	Software	Israel	20,000,000	36,000,000	
64	July 1, 2001	Yupi	Online Spanish portal	United States	—	—	
65	March 11, 2002	Classic Custom Vacations	Travel agency	United States	78,000,000	140,000,000	
66	May 22, 2002	Sales Management Systems	Software	United States	—	—	
67	July 12, 2002	Navision	Software programming	Denmark	1,330,000,000	2.381×10^{9}	
68	July 29, 2002	Mobilocity	Computer consulting	United States	—	—	
69	September 10, 2002	XDegrees	Security software	United States	—	—	
70	September 24, 2002	Rare	Video games	United Kingdom	375,000,000	671,000,000	
71	December 13, 2002	Vicinity	Online enterprise location	United States	95,849,000	172,000,000	
72	February 25, 2003	Connectix	Software	United States	—	—	
73	March 3, 2003	DCG	Internet software	Australia	—	—	
74	April 30, 2003	PlaceWare	Web conferencing	United States	200,000,000	350,000,000	
75	May 27, 2003	G.A. Sullivan	Information technology	United States	—	—	
76	June 10, 2003	GeCAD Software	Antivirus technology	Romania	—	—	
77	August 29, 2003	3DO Co-High Heat Baseball	Software	United States	450,000	1,000,000	
78	April 22, 2004	Encore Bus Solutions-IP Asts	IP assets	United States	—	—	
79	April 26, 2004	ActiveViews	Reporting systems	United States	—	—	
80	July 16, 2004	Lookout Software	Personal search tool	United States	—	—	
81	December 16, 2004	GIANT Company Software	Anti-spyware	United States	—	—	
82	March 2, 2005	en'tegrate	Software	United States	—	—	
83	March 10, 2005	Groove Networks	Community software	United States	120,000,000	198,000,000	
84	May 11, 2005	MessageCast	Messaging	United States	7,000,000	12,000,000	
85	May 31, 2005	Tsinghua-Shenxun-Cert Asts	Certain assets	China	15,000,000	25,000,000	
86	June 21, 2005	Sybari Software	Software	United States	—	—	
87	August 29, 2005	Teleo	VoIP	United States	—	—	
88	August 31, 2005	FrontBridge Technologies	Email protection	United States	—	—	
89	September 19, 2005	Alacris	Certificate management software	United States	—	—	
90	November 3, 2005	media-streams.com	Software	Switzerland	—	—	
91	November 17, 2005	5th Finger	Mobile	Australia	3,153,000	5,000,000	
92	January 19, 2006	UMT-Software and IP Assets	Software	United States	—	—	
93	February 13, 2006	MotionBridge	Search	France	17,858,000	29,000,000	
94	February 13, 2006	Seadragon Software	Software	United States	—	—	
95	March 7, 2006	Apptimum	Software	United States	—	—	
96	March 7, 2006	Onfolio	Internet software	United States	—	—	
97	April 6, 2006	Lionhead Studios	Video games	United Kingdom	—	—	
98	April 26, 2006	AssetMetrix	Enterprise asset intelligence (SaaS)	Canada	18,000,000	29,000,000	
99	May 4, 2006	Massive Incorporated	Video game advertising	United States	—	—	
100	May 4, 2006	Vexcel	Mapping software	United States	—	—	
101	May 15, 2006	DeepMetrix	Web log analysis	United States	—	—	
102	June 6, 2006	ProClarity	Analysis software	United States	—	—	
103	June 27, 2006	iView Multimedia	Digital asset management	United Kingdom	—	—	
104	July 17, 2006	Softricity	Application virtualization software	United States	—	—	
105	July 18, 2006	Winternals Software	Software	United States	—	—	
106	July 26, 2006	Whale Communications	Applications	Israel	—	—	
107	September 26, 2006	Gteko	Applications	Israel	—	—	
108	October 2, 2006	DesktopStandard	Applications	United States	—	—	
109	October 12, 2006	Colloquis	Natural language software	United States	—	—	
110	March 9, 2007	Medstory	Internet search engine	United States	—	—	
111	March 26, 2007	devBiz Business Solutions	Software tools	United States	—	—	
112	May 3, 2007	ScreenTonic	Advertising and marketing	France	—	—	
113	May 3, 2007	Tellme Networks	Mobile phone software	United States	—	—	
114	May 9, 2007	SoftArtisans	Business Intelligence software	United States	—	—	
115	June 4, 2007	Engyro	Information technology	United States	—	—	
116	June 7, 2007	Stratature	Master data management	United States	—	—	
117	June 29, 2007	Savvis Inc-Data Centers	Networking	United States	200,000,000	311,000,000	
118	August 13, 2007	AdECN	Ad Exchange	United States	45,000,000	70,000,000	
119	August 13, 2007	aQuantive	Digital marketing	United States	6,333,000,000	9.833×10^{9}	
120	October 2, 2007	Jellyfish.com	Search engine	United States	—	—	
121	October 5, 2007	Parlano	Enterprise messaging software	United States	—	—	
122	October 29, 2007	Global Care Solutions-Assets	Assets	Thailand	—	—	
123	November 1, 2007	HOB Business Solutions	Information technology	Denmark	—	—	
124	November 15, 2007	Musiwave	Mobile music entertainment	France	—	—	
125	December 12, 2007	Multimap.com	Mapping	United Kingdom	—	—	
126	January 22, 2008	Calista Technologies	Software	United States	—	—	
127	February 7, 2008	Caligari Corporation	Software	United States	—	—	
128	February 27, 2008	YaData	Software	Israel	—	—	
129	March 14, 2008	Rapt	Advertising yield management software	United States	—	—	
130	March 19, 2008	Komoku	Rootkit security software	United States	5,000,000	7,000,000	
131	March 31, 2008	90 Degree Software	Business intelligence software	Canada	—	—	
132	April 14, 2008	Farecast	Online search software	United States	75,000,000	112,000,000	
133	April 15, 2008	Danger	Mobile Internet software	United States	500,000,000	748,000,000	
134	April 25, 2008	Fast Search & Transfer	Enterprise search	Norway	1,191,000,000	1.781×10^{9}	
135	May 26, 2008	Kidaro	Software	United States	—	—	
136	June 4, 2008	Quadreon	Software	Belgium	—	—	
137	June 18, 2008	Navic Networks	Management software	United States	—	—	
138	June 26, 2008	Mobicomp	Mobile applications	Portugal	—	—	
139	August 11, 2008	Powerset	Semantic Search	United States	—	—	
140	September 16, 2008	DATAllegro	Data software	United States	—	—	
141	September 28, 2008	Greenfield Online	Search and e-commerce services	United States	486,000,000	727,000,000	
142	March 1, 2009	3DV Systems	Developer of ZCam, a time-of-flight camera	Israel	35,000,000	53,000,000	
143	May 7, 2009	BigPark	Video games interactive online gaming	Canada	—	—	
144	June 1, 2009	Rosetta Biosoftware	Bioinformatics solutions for life science research	United States	—	—	
145	September 22, 2009	Interactive Supercomputing	Software	United States	—	—	
146	December 10, 2009	Opalis Software	Software	Canada	—	—	
147	February 2, 2010	Sentillion, Inc.	Software for the healthcare industry	United States	—	—	
148	October 6, 2010	AVIcode, Inc.	.Net monitoring technology	United States	—	—	
149	October 29, 2010	Canesta, Inc.	3D sensing technology	United States	—	—	
150	May 10, 2011	Skype Technologies	Telecommunications	Luxembourg	8,500,000,000	1.2165×10^{10}	
151	June 7, 2011	Prodiance	Software	United States	—	—	
152	October 12, 2011	Twisted Pixel Games	Video games	United States	—	—	
153	November 22, 2011	Videosurf	Video search	United States	100,000,000	143,000,000	
154	June 5, 2012	Press Play	Video games	Denmark	—	—	
155	June 25, 2012	Yammer	Social networking	United States	1,200,000,000	1.683×10^{9}	
156	July 9, 2012	Perceptive Pixel	Multi touch hardware	United States	—	—	
157	October 4, 2012	PhoneFactor	Two-factor authentication system	United States	—	—	
158	October 16, 2012	StorSimple	Cloud-storage appliance vendor	United States	—	—	
159	October 17, 2012	MarketingPilot	Marketing automation firm	United States	—	—	
160	January 3, 2013	id8 Group R2 Studios	Home automation	United States	—	—	
161	February 2, 2013	Pando Networks	Peer-to-peer (P2P) media distribution	United States	—	—	
162	March 4, 2013	MetricsHub	Cloud monitoring	United States	—	—	
163	March 19, 2013	Netbreeze	Social analytics	Switzerland	—	—	
164	June 3, 2013	InRelease	Release management	Canada	—	—	
165	September 2, 2013	Nokia mobile phones unit	Mobile phones, smartphones	Finland	7,200,000,000	9.951×10^{9}	
166	October 12, 2013	HLW Software	RDP applications	Austria	—	—	
167	October 25, 2013	Apiphany	API management	United States	—	—	
168	January 7, 2014	Parature	Customer service software	United States	100,000,000	136,000,000	
169	May 1, 2014	GreenButton	Cloud computing	New Zealand	—	—	
170	May 1, 2014	Capptain	(Mobile) application development	France	—	—	
171	July 2, 2014	SyntaxTree	Developer tools	France	—	—	
172	July 11, 2014	InMage	Disaster recovery solutions	India	—	—	
173	August 1, 2014	Inception Mobile Inc.	Software	Canada	—	—	
174	November 6, 2014	Mojang Studios	Video games	Sweden	2,500,000,000	3.400×10^{9}	
175	November 13, 2014	Aorato	Enterprise security & machine learning	Israel	—	—	
176	December 2, 2014	Acompli	Mobile email apps	United States	—	—	
177	December 11, 2014	HockeyApp	Mobile beta distribution & crash analytics	Germany	—	—	
178	January 20, 2015	Equivio	Text analytics service	Israel	—	—	
179	January 23, 2015	Revolution Analytics	Statistical computing and predictive analytics	United States	—	—	
180	February 4, 2015	Sunrise Atelier, Inc.	Sunrise Calendar applications	United States	100,000,000	136,000,000	
181	February 12, 2015	N-trig	Styli and pen input hardware and software	Israel	200,000,000	272,000,000	
182	March 26, 2015	LiveLoop	PowerPoint collaboration	United States	—	—	
183	April 14, 2015	Datazen Software, Inc.	Mobile business intelligence & data visualization	Canada	—	—	
184	June 2, 2015	6 Wunderkinder GmbH	Wunderlist to-do list applications	Germany	—	—	
185	June 10, 2015	BlueStripe Software	Application management	United States	—	—	
186	July 16, 2015	FieldOne Systems LLC	Enterprise field service	United States	—	—	
187	July 19, 2015	Adallom	Cloud security	Israel	320,000,000	435,000,000	
188	August 3, 2015	Incent Games, LLC	Sales-gamification	United States	—	—	
189	September 3, 2015	VoloMetrix, Inc.	Organisational analytics	United States	—	—	
190	September 11, 2015	Double Labs, Inc.	Mobile lock screen software	United States	—	—	
191	September 28, 2015	Adxstudio Inc.	Web portal and application lifecycle management solutions	Canada	—	—	
192	October 2, 2015	Havok	Video game physics engine	Ireland	—	—	
193	November 5, 2015	Mobile Data Labs, Inc.	MileIQ, a mileage tracking application	United States	—	—	
194	November 9, 2015	Secure Islands Technologies Ltd.	Data protection	Israel	—	—	
195	December 18, 2015	Metanautix	Big data analytics	United States	—	—	
196	December 21, 2015	Talko, Inc.	Mobile communications	United States	—	—	
197	January 13, 2016	Event Zero	VoIP Products	Australia	—	—	
198	January 19, 2016	Teacher Gaming LLC	Education software	Finland	—	—	
199	February 3, 2016	SwiftKey	Virtual keyboard	United Kingdom	250,000,000	335,000,000	
200	February 9, 2016	Groove	Music discovery	Canada	—	—	
201	February 24, 2016	Xamarin	Mobile application development	United States	—	—	
202	May 3, 2016	Solair	Internet of Things platform	Italy	—	—	
203	June 16, 2016	Wand Labs	Conversation as a service	United States	—	—	
204	August 8, 2016	Beam	Video game streaming	United States	—	—	
205	August 20, 2016	Genee	AI-powered scheduling assistant service	United States	—	—	
206	December 8, 2016	LinkedIn	Professional social network	United States	26,200,000,000	3.5148×10^{10}	
207	January 13, 2017	Maluuba	Artificial intelligence	Canada	140,000,000	184,000,000	
208	January 17, 2017	Simplygon	3D graphics optimization	Sweden	—	—	
209	April 10, 2017	Deis	Container management	United States	—	—	
210	April 18, 2017	Intentional Software	Intentional programming	United States	—	—	
211	June 8, 2017	Hexadite	Cybersecurity	Israel	100,000,000	131,000,000	
212	June 28, 2017	Cloudyn	Cloud business management	Israel	50,000,000	66,000,000	
213	August 15, 2017	Cycle Computing	Cloud HPC	United States	—	—	
214	October 3, 2017	AltspaceVR	Virtual reality	United States	—	—	
215	November 7, 2017	SWNG	Cinemagraphic photo app	United States	—	—	
216	January 3, 2018	Avere Systems	Data management	United States	—	—	
217	January 29, 2018	Playfab	Gaming backend service	United States	—	—	
218	May 18, 2018	Semantic Machines	Conversational AI	United States	400,000,000	513,000,000	
219	June 11, 2018	Ninja Theory	Video games	United Kingdom	117,000,000	150,000,000	
220	June 11, 2018	Undead Labs	Video games	United States	—	—	
221	June 11, 2018	Compulsion Games	Video games	Canada	—	—	
222	June 11, 2018	Playground Games	Video games	United Kingdom	—	—	
223	June 18, 2018	Flipgrid	Education, video discussion platform	United States	—	—	
224	June 20, 2018	Bonsai	Industrial AI platform	United States	—	—	
225	September 13, 2018	Lobe	Artificial intelligence	United States	—	—	
226	October 9, 2018	Glint	Employee engagement	United States	400,000,000	513,000,000	
227	October 26, 2018	GitHub	Software development and version control platform	United States	7,500,000,000	9.616×10^{9}	
228	November 10, 2018	inXile Entertainment	Video games	United States	—	—	
229	November 10, 2018	Obsidian Entertainment	Video games	United States	—	—	
230	November 14, 2018	XOXCO	Conversational AI	United States	—	—	
231	November 19, 2018	FSLogix	Application provisioning and virtualization	United States	—	—	
232	November 30, 2018	Spectrum	Social networks for design and development	United States	—	—	
233	January 24, 2019	Citus Data	Database management	United States	—	—	
234	February 4, 2019	DataSense	Database management	United States	—	—	
235	April 18, 2019	Express Logic	Real-time operating systems	United States	—	—	
236	May 23, 2019	Dependabot	Open source tool	United Kingdom	—	—	
237	May 28, 2019	Drawbridge	AI & machine learning technology	United States	—	—	
238	June 9, 2019	Double Fine Productions	Video games	United States	—	—	
239	June 17, 2019	Pull Panda	Software	United States	—	—	
240	July 29, 2019	BlueTalon	Data privacy and governance service	United States	—	—	
241	August 5, 2019	PromoteIQ	Retail e-commerce improvement	United States	—	—	
242	August 19, 2019	jClarity	Java software optimization	United States	—	—	
243	September 5, 2019	Movere	Cloud migration	United States	—	—	
244	September 18, 2019	Semmle	Code analysis tool	United States	—	—	
245	October 21, 2019	Mover	File migration	Canada	—	—	
246	March 16, 2020	npm	Software and JavaScript modules	United States	—	—	
247	March 26, 2020	Affirmed Networks	5G Networking	United States	1,350,000,000	1.679×10^{9}	
248	May 14, 2020	Metaswitch Networks	5G Networking	United Kingdom	—	—	
249	May 19, 2020	Softomotive	Robotic Process Automation	United Kingdom	—	—	
250	June 18, 2020	ADRM Software	Data modeling startup	United States	—	—	
251	June 22, 2020	CyberX	IoT/OT Security	United States	165,000,000	205,000,000	
252	July 7, 2020	Orions Systems	Dynamics 365 - SMart vision	United States	—	—	
253	September 21, 2020	ZeniMax Media	Video games	United States	8,100,000,000	1.0077×10^{10}	
254	December 2, 2020	Smash.gg	Esports	United States	—	—	
255	March 16, 2021	The Marsden Group	Tech in complex industrial environments	United States	—	—	
256	April 12, 2021	Nuance Communications	Speech synthesis and speech recognition	United States	19,700,000,000	2.3406×10^{10}	
257	April 29, 2021	Kinvolk	Open source Kubernetes solutions and tools.	Germany	—	—	
258	June 2, 2021	ReFirm Labs	IoT security and embedded devices	United States	—	—	
259	June 30, 2021	AT&T Technology Network Cloud	5G Networking	United States	—	—	
260	July 12, 2021	RiskIQ	Cybersecurity ransomware	United States	500,000,000	594,000,000	
261	July 22, 2021	CloudKnox	Cloud infrastructure entitlement management security	United States	—	—	
262	July 28, 2021	Suplari	Software	United States	—	—	
263	August 10, 2021	Peer5	Peer-to-peer network technology	United States	—	—	
264	September 7, 2021	Clipchamp	Video-editing software	Australia	—	—	
265	September 8, 2021	TakeLessons	Education	United States	—	—	
266	October 7, 2021	Ally.io	Productivity	United States	—	—	
267	October 22, 2021	Clear Software	Software	United States	—	—	
268	October 29, 2021	Two Hat	Content moderation	Canada	—	—	
269	December 21, 2021	Xandr	Digital Media	United States	1,000,000,000	1.188×10^{9}	
270	January 18, 2022	Activision Blizzard	Video games	United States	75,400,000,000	8.2954×10^{10}	
271	February 28, 2022	Oribi	Marketing analytics	Israel	85,000,000	94,000,000	
272	March 31, 2022	Minit	Process mining software	Netherlands	—	—	
273	June 15, 2022	Miburo	Cyberthreat analysis and research specializing	United States	—	—	
274	December 9, 2022	Lumenisity	Optical networking	United Kingdom	—	—	
275	January 9, 2023	Fungible	composable infrastructure	United States	—	—	
276	April 5, 2023	Nemesys Games	Video games	Hungary	—	—	
277	April 30, 2025	Mahi Labs	Natural Language Web	United States	—	—	
278	November 25, 2025	Pi Labs	AI development tools	United States	—	—	
279	January 5, 2026	Osmos	Software	United States	—	—	
280	April 18, 2026	Fintool	AI development tools	United States	—	—	

== Stakes ==
Date	Company	Business	Country	Value (USD)	Adjusted (USD)	References
June 15, 1989	Santa Cruz Operation (Note: Microsoft acquired an interest representing less than 20% of Santa Cruz Operation.)	Wholesale computer software	United States	—	—	
March 18, 1991	Dorling Kindersley (Note: Microsoft acquired a 26% stake in Dorling Kindersley.)	Reference books	United Kingdom	14,340,000	34,000,000	
June 21, 1994	Stac Electronics	Data compression software	United States	39,900,000	87,000,000	
January 19, 1995	UUNet	Internet service provider	United States	—	—	
May 30, 1995	Wang Laboratories	Software consulting	United States	90,000,000	190,000,000	
October 12, 1995	Individual	On-line information retrieval	United States	—	—	
April 1, 1996	Mobile Telecom Technologies (Note: Microsoft acquired a 2.5% stake in Mobile Telecom Technologies.)	Cellular telephones	United States	25,000,000	51,000,000	
April 22, 1996	Helicon Publishing	Electronic books	United States	—	—	
September 9, 1996	SingleTrac	Video games	United States	—	—	
October 1, 1996	WebTV Networks	Internet service provider	United States	—	—	
October 28, 1996	VDOnet	Internet services	United States	—	—	
February 3, 1997	CMGI (Note: Microsoft acquired a 4.9% stake in CMGI.)	Direct mail	United States	20,000,000	40,000,000	
February 18, 1997	Digital Anvil	Video games	United States	—	—	
March 3, 1997	Interse	Internet software	United States	—	—	
June 30, 1997	Comcast (Note: Microsoft acquired an 11.5% stake in Comcast.)	Cable television	United States	1,000,000,000	2.006×10^{9}	
August 6, 1997	Apple Inc. (Note: Microsoft acquired a 5% stake in Apple Inc.)	Personal computers	United States	150,000,000	301,000,000	
August 19, 1997	Progressive Networks (Note: Microsoft acquired a 10% in Progressive Networks.)	Internet software	United States	30,000,000	60,000,000	
September 11, 1997	Lernout & Hauspie Speech (Note: Microsoft acquired an 8% stake in Lernout & Hauspie Speech.)	Multilingual software	Belgium	45,000,000	90,000,000	
September 23, 1997	E-Stamp (Note: Microsoft acquired a 10% stake in E-Stamp.)	Internet software	United States	—	—	
March 4, 1998	General Magic	Community software	United States	6,000,000	12,000,000	
March 6, 1998	WavePhore (Note: Microsoft acquired a 2.88% stake in WavePhore.)	Radio and television equipment	United States	—	—	
June 18, 1998	Pluto Technologies	Network and storage	United States	—	—	
December 14, 1998	Qwest Communications (Note: Microsoft acquired a 1.32% stake in Qwest Communications.)	Telecommunications	United States	200,000,000	395,000,000	
January 6, 1999	SkyTel Communications (Note: Microsoft acquired a 5.7% stake in SkyTel Communications.)	Cellular telephones	United States	—	—	
January 31, 1999	United Pan-Europe Comm NV (Note: Microsoft acquired a 7.9% stake in United Pan-Europe Comm NV.)	Broadband communities	Netherlands	300,000,000	580,000,000	
February 1, 1999	NTL (Note: Microsoft acquired a 5.25% stake in NTL.)	Communications	United Kingdom	500,000,000	966,000,000	
February 2, 1999	Banyan (Note: Microsoft acquired a 7.5% stake in Banyan.)	Software	United States	10,000,000	19,000,000	
March 2, 1999	Dialogic	Computer telephony	United States	24,200,000	47,000,000	
March 8, 1999	Reciprocal	Copyright protection	United States	—	—	
April 1, 1999	TV Cabo Portugal SA	Cable television	Portugal	38,600,000	75,000,000	
April 10, 1999	Lernout & Hauspie Speech	Multilingual software	Belgium	15,000,000	29,000,000	
June 8, 1999	Inprise	Computer software	United States	125,000,000	242,000,000	
June 8, 1999	NaviSite (Note: Microsoft acquired a 4.4% stake in NaviSite.)	Internet service provider	United States	—	—	
June 19, 1999	AT&T (Note: Microsoft acquired a 3% stake in AT&T.)	Telecommunications	United States	5,000,000,000	9.663×10^{9}	
June 22, 1999	Concentric Network	IP-based networks	United States	50,000,000	97,000,000	
July 5, 1999	WebMD	Web-based health information	United States	250,000,000	483,000,000	
August 20, 1999	Tuttle Decision Systems	Mortgage pricing information	United States	—	—	
August 25, 1999	Rogers Communications	Radio and television stations	Canada	405,120,000	783,000,000	
December 3, 1999	Korea Thrunet (Note: Microsoft acquired a 6% stake in Korea Thrunet.)	Internet service provider	South Korea	36,000,000	70,000,000	
December 28, 1999	Globo Cabo (Note: Microsoft acquired an 11.5% stake in Globo Cabo.)	Cable television	Brazil	126,000,000	244,000,000	
December 30, 1999	Commtouch Software (Note: Microsoft acquired a 5.6% stake in CommTouch Software.)	Community security software	Israel	20,000,000	39,000,000	
December 31, 1999	Gigamedia (Note: Microsoft acquired a 10% stake in Gigamedia.)	Internet service provider	Taiwan	31,470,000	61,000,000	
January 24, 2000	Intertainer	Interactive systems	United States	56,000,000	105,000,000	
January 24, 2000	VerticalNet (Note: Microsoft acquired a 1.35% stake in VerticalNet.)	Management solutions	United States	100,000,000	187,000,000	
February 23, 2000	BroadBand Office	Communication	United States	25,000,000	47,000,000	
March 2, 2000	Ecoss (Note: Microsoft acquired a 5% stake in Ecoss.)	Computer programming	Japan	46,000	86000	
March 13, 2000	RealNames (Note: Microsoft acquired a 20% stake in RealNames.)	Internet navigation	United States	—	—	
March 14, 2000	MEASAT Broadcast Network (Note: Microsoft acquired a 9% stake in MEASAT Broadcast Network.)	Television broadcasting	Malaysia	100,000,000	187,000,000	
April 14, 2000	Best Buy	Retail stores	United States	200,000,000	374,000,000	
July 7, 2000	Telewest Communications (Note: Microsoft acquired 22.98% of Telewest Communications.)	Cable television	United States	2,263,000,000	4.231×10^{9}	
July 13, 2000	Blixer Net	Online telecommunications	Italy	—	—	
August 4, 2000	CAIS Internet	Internet access	United States	40,000,000	75,000,000	
October 2, 2000	Corel Corporation (Note: Microsoft acquired 24 million preferred shares of Corel Corporation.)	Software	Canada	89,370,000	167,000,000	
November 29, 2000	Chyron Corporation (Note: Microsoft acquired an 8.73% stake in Chyron Corporation.)	Digital graphics	United States	6,000,000	11,000,000	
February 12, 2001	Audible.com	Online audio retail	United States	10,000,000	18,000,000	
July 23, 2001	Sendo (Note: Microsoft acquired a 10% stake in Sendo.)	Mobile handset	United Kingdom	—	—	
February 14, 2002	USA Networks (Note: Microsoft acquired a 15.4% stake in USA Networks.)	Television stations	United States	—	—	
November 3, 2005	ByteTaxi	Software	United States	—	—	
October 24, 2007	Facebook (Note: Microsoft acquired a 1.6% stake in Facebook.)	Social network	United States	240,000,000	373,000,000	
April 8, 2008	OKWave (Note: Microsoft acquired a 10.52% stake in OKWave.)	On-line community site	Japan	2,515,000	4,000,000	
June 12, 2008	Zignals (Note: Microsoft acquired a 15% stake in Zignals.)	Online trading	Ireland	—	—	
April 7, 2011	Toyota Media Service Corp (Note: Microsoft acquires minority stake in Toyota Media Service Corp)	Web marketing services	Japan	—	—	
February 7, 2012	24/7 (Note: Microsoft acquires minority stake in 24/7)	Outsourcing and call center services	United States	—	—	
April 30, 2012	Barnes & Noble (Note: Microsoft acquires a 17.6% stake in Newco)	Book retailer	United States	605,000,000	848,000,000	
October 9, 2018	Grab	Ride-hailing firm	Singapore	—	—	
February 4, 2019	Databricks	Software for processing large-scale data in public clouds	United States	—	—	
August 20, 2021	Oyo Rooms	Hospitality	India	5,000,000	6,000,000	
October 3, 2022	WeMade Entertainment	Video games and blockchain	South Korea	—	—	
December 12, 2022	London Stock Exchange Group (Note: Microsoft acquired a 4% stake in London Stock Exchange Group)	Financial services	United Kingdom	2,000,000,000	2.200×10^{9}	

== Divestitures ==
Date	Acquirer	Target company	Target business	Acquirer country	Value (USD)	Adjusted (USD)	References
March 31, 1989	Steve Ballmer	Microsoft (Note: Steve Ballmer acquired 945,000 Microsoft shares.)	Wholesale computer software	United States	46,200,000	120,000,000	
June 17, 1992	Microsoft	Microsoft (Note: Microsoft repurchased 1.9% of Microsoft shares.)	Wholesale computer software	United States	63,750,000	146,000,000	
July 6, 1994	Microsoft	Microsoft (Note: Microsoft repurchased 3% of Microsoft's common stock.)	Wholesale computer software	United States	348,000,000	756,000,000	
December 22, 1994	TCI Technology Ventures	MSN (Note: TCI Technology Ventures acquired 20% of MSN.)	Internet service provider	United States	125,000,000	272,000,000	
November 15, 1996	Microsoft	MSN (Note: Microsoft acquired the remaining 20% stake that it did not already own in MSN from Tele-Communications Inc.)	Internet service provider	United States	125,000,000	257,000,000	
December 19, 1996	Proginet	TransAccess	Software	United States	1,740,000	4,000,000	
August 3, 1998	Avid Technology	Softimage	3-D visualization software	Canada	284,295,000	562,000,000	
September 21, 1999	Ticketmaster Online-CitySearch	MSN Sidewalk	Internet city guide	United States	340,000,000	657,000,000	
February 24, 2000	Electronic Arts	DreamWorks Interactive	Video games	United States	—	—	
August 10, 2000	Envoy Communications	Sage Information Consultants	Consulting	Canada	23,730,000	44,000,000	
September 1, 2000	Jupiter Telecommunications	Titus Communications	Cable television	Japan	—	—	
December 31, 2000	Technology Crossover Ventures	Expedia, Inc. (Note: Technology Crossover Ventures has acquired 6% of Expedia, Inc.)	Online travel	United States	50,000,000	93,000,000	
June 26, 2001	CNBC	MSN MoneyCentral	Financial information	United States	—	—	
February 5, 2002	USA Networks	Expedia, Inc.	Online travel	United States	1,372,000,000	2.456×10^{9}	
July 26, 2002	Liberty Media	Chofu CATV	Cable television	Japan	16,000,000	29,000,000	
August 12, 2002	Agency.com	KPE Inc-Certain Assets	—	United States	—	—	
February 22, 2003	The Reynolds and Reynolds Company	MSN Autos-Dealerpoint Business	Online auto retail	United States	—	—	
May 29, 2003	Telewest 22.98%	IDT	—	United Kingdom	5,000,000	9,000,000	
October 31, 2003	Perri Croshaw	HWW Ltd-Women's Money Magazine	Magazines	Australia	—	—	
November 4, 2003	Northgate Information Solutions	PWA Group	Software	United Kingdom	7,052,000	12,000,000	
October 2004	Take-Two Interactive	Indie Games	Video games	United States	—	—	
January 14, 2005	The Washington Post Company	Slate	Online magazine	United States	—	—	
February 28, 2005	Ubisoft Entertainment	Microsoft Games- Sports Games	Video games	France	—	—	
December 23, 2005	NBC Universal	MSNBC	Cable news channel	United States	—	—	
August 17, 2006	Microsoft	Microsoft (Note: Microsoft acquired 7.92% of its own common stock outstanding.)	Wholesale computer software	United States	20,000,000,000	3.1941×10^{10}	
May 11, 2007	MacDonald Dettwiler	Vexcel Canada	Mapping software	United States	—	—	
September 22, 2008	Microsoft	Microsoft (Note: Microsoft repurchased 7.92% of its common stock outstanding.)	Wholesale computer software	United States	36,200,000,000	5.4132×10^{10}	
August 9, 2009	Publicis Groupe	Razorfish	Advertising agency	France	530,000,000	795,000,000	
May 25, 2010	Phase One	Expression Media	Digital media asset management software	Denmark	—	—	
October 16, 2011	Orion Health Asia Pacific of New Zealand	Microsoft-HIS Software (Hospital Information System Software)	Hospital information systems	New Zealand	—	—	
March 19, 2012	LeGuide.com SA	Ciao GmbH	Provider of online shopping services	France	—	—	
July 14, 2012	NBC Universal	MSNBC	Cable news channel	United States	300,000,000	421,000,000	
September 5, 2013	Ericsson	Microsoft Mediaroom	End-to-end video platform	Sweden	—	—	
February 2013	Meta Platforms	Atlas Solutions	Online advertising	United States	—	—	
December 18, 2014	Line Corporation (Naver)	MixRadio	Online music streaming	Japan	—	—	
June 30, 2015	Uber	Street-mapping data	Online maps	United States	—	—	
June 30, 2015	Verizon Communications	Display ads	Online advertising	United States	—	—	

== See also ==
- List of largest mergers and acquisitions
- Lists of corporate acquisitions and mergers

== Sources ==
- "Microsoft Corporation Mergers and Acquisitions". Thomson Financial. Archived from the original on August 3, 2009.
