= Sweating Bullets =

Sweating Bullets may refer to:

- "Sweating Bullets" (song), by Megadeth from their 1992 album Countdown to Extinction
- "Sweatin Bullets", a song from 1994's Everything is Everything (Brand Nubian album)
- Sweating Bullets, the alternative name of the Canadian TV series Tropical Heat (1991–1993)
- Sweating Bullets, the pre-release name of the 2004 animated film Home on the Range (2004 film)
- Sweating Bullets: Notes about Inventing PowerPoint, the title of a 2012 book by Robert Gaskins
