= All Saints Church, Medzany =

Church building in Medzany, Slovakia

Coordinates: 49°02′41.07″N 21°09′2.01″E

All Saints Church is a Roman Catholic Church in Medzany, Saris region, Slovakia.

The original church was built in 1330. A monastery stood in the field of the church from 1260 and the current church was probably built from its remains.

The church had a thatched roof until 1900. In the year 1940 the interior of the altar was painted. In the year 1970 rebuilding of choir was realized, the space extended to the tower. In the following year side chapels were built, the pavement was added into the interior replacing flagstones. At the same time pews and seats were substituted. In the following year whole interior was repainted. After the year 2000 work started for the construction of aisles on both sides and at the same time the space of the sacristy was extended. Pavement was added to the whole interior. In the present altar is decorating with gold.

== UPG Project ==
This church will be modelled in 3D graphic program trueSpace.

== Sources ==
- Popish newspaper 43/1979
