= The Cabinet of Dr. Caligari (disambiguation) =

The Cabinet of Dr. Caligari is a 1920 German silent film.

The Cabinet of Dr. Caligari may also refer to:

- The Cabinet of Dr. Caligari (2005 film)

== See also ==
- The Cabinet of Caligari, a 1962 horror film
- Caligari Corporation
- Dr. Caligari (film), a 1989 film
