= Atdmt =

ATDMT is a tracking cookie served by Facebook subsidiary Atlas Solutions and used as a third-party cookie by several websites. The cookie originates from the domain atdmt.com which is owned by Atlas.
