= AQuantive =

Defunct American public company

aQuantive
- Website: www.aquantive.com (offline)

aQuantive, Inc. was the parent company of a group of three digital marketing service and technology companies: Avenue A/Razorfish, Atlas Solutions, and DRIVE Performance Solutions. Based in Seattle, Washington, the company was founded in 1997. According to Advertising Age magazine, in 2005 it ranked 14th by revenue among advertising agencies worldwide.

On May 18, 2007, Microsoft announced that it would acquire the company for US$6 billion, the largest acquisition in Microsoft's history until its 2011 purchase of Skype. The acquisition closed on August 10, 2007. aQuantive became part of Microsoft's newly created Advertiser and Publisher Solutions (APS) Group. On July 2, 2012, Microsoft announced that it would take a $6.2 billion writedown, mostly related to the 2007 acquisition of aQuantive. In February 2013, Facebook acquired Atlas Ad Serving from Microsoft.
