= Dennis Austin =

American software developer (1947–2023)

- Born: May 28, 1947; Pittsburgh, Pennsylvania, U.S.
- Died: September 1, 2023 (aged 76); Los Altos, California, U.S.
- Education: University of Virginia (BA); Arizona State University; Massachusetts Institute of Technology; University of California, Santa Barbara
- Occupation: Software developer
- Employer(s): General Electric; Honeywell; Burroughs Corporation; Xerox PARC; Gavilan Computer; Forethought, Inc; Microsoft
- Known for: Lead software developer for PowerPoint
- Spouse: Jan Austin
- Children: Michael Austin

Dennis Robert Austin (May 28, 1947 – September 1, 2023) was an American software developer. He played a pivotal role as the lead software developer for PowerPoint between 1985 and 1996, focusing primarily on its versions tailored for Apple Macintosh computers.

Austin's initial encounter with computers took place during a high school summer program at the Carnegie Institute of Technology. This ignited a profound interest in programming languages and compilers, which he further cultivated during his undergraduate engineering studies at the University of Virginia in the late 1960s.

== Early life ==
Born on May 28, 1947, in Pittsburgh, United States, Dennis R. Austin spent his formative years in the suburb of Rosslyn Farms. His father was in charge of an executives' association, while his mother initially worked as a typist before dedicating herself to homemaking.

Austin pursued his engineering studies at the University of Virginia. After graduating in 1969, he continued his academic journey with graduate studies in engineering at Arizona State University, the Massachusetts Institute of Technology, and the University of California, Santa Barbara.

== Career ==
Austin embarked on his software career at General Electric's computer division in Arizona. He then held positions at Honeywell in Massachusetts and Burroughs in California. It was during his time at Xerox PARC that Austin was exposed to the revolutionary graphical user interface and a more expansive graphical approach to computing. Subsequently, he became a software developer at Gavilan Computer, before making his way to Forethought, Inc in late 1984. It was here that Robert Gaskins spearheaded the development of graphical presentation software, which would ultimately evolve into PowerPoint, with Gaskins assuming the role of architect. Austin took the reins as the principal developer for PowerPoint, actively contributing to its conceptualization and execution.

The PowerPoint project saw the addition of Tom Rudkin, who made substantial contributions to the programming efforts alongside Austin. Even after Microsoft's acquisition of Forethought in 1987, Austin continued to play a central role in the development of PowerPoint until 1996. An oral history of Austin from the Computer History Museum focuses on his journey in software creation, with a special emphasis on his pivotal contributions to PowerPoint. The museum has an archive of Austin PowerPoint-related material.

== Death ==
On September 1, 2023, Austin died at his residence in Los Altos, California, at the age of 76. The cause of his death was attributed to lung cancer that had metastasized to his brain, as confirmed by his son, Michael Austin.
