= SoftArtisans =

SoftArtisans is an American company that develops active server components and reporting solutions for Microsoft web development environments such as ASP.NET. The company has two products: OfficeWriter, a .NET-based Microsoft Office reporting solution and FileUp, a client-server-server HTTP file transfer provider.

SoftArtisans was founded by David Wihl in 1996 and is headquartered in Watertown, Massachusetts. The company currently has around 30 employees and has been listed on the Inc. 500 and North America Fast 500. In 2007, Microsoft acquired all the intellectual property of OfficeWriter.

== Microsoft Acquisition ==
In 2007, Microsoft announced the acquisition of all the intellectual property of OfficeWriter as part of their Business Intelligence expansion. OfficeWriter functionality was partially integrated into SQL Server 2008.

== Products ==
OfficeWriter: OfficeWriter is a server-side reporting tool that generates Excel spreadsheets and Word documents over the Web from various data sources without Microsoft Office on the server. Users create .xls and .doc templates for Excel spreadsheets and Word documents, store them on the server, and write a short .NET script that allows the template to be populated with data. Used as a renderer within SQL Server 2008, OfficeWriter also generates Report Definition Language (RDL) files that preserve Excel features.

FileUp: FileUp is an HTTP file transfer service that allows web developers to upload and download multi-gigabyte files and applications. FileUp transmits files of any format from a local hard disk to a server running Microsoft Internet Information Server (IIS) or to a separate file server that is networked to the Web server.

== See also ==
- Microsoft SQL Server
- File Transfer Service
- Microsoft SharePoint
