= Microsoft PowerPoint =

Presentation application, part of Microsoft 365 and Microsoft Office

- A photo presentation being created and edited in PowerPoint, running on Windows 11
- Original author: Forethought, Inc.
- Developer: Microsoft
- Release: April 20, 1987; 39 years ago
- Stable release: 2604 (Build 19929.20136) / 5 May 2026; 6 months ago
- Written in: C++ (back-end)
- Operating system: Microsoft Windows
- Available in: 102 languages
- List of languages Afrikaans, Albanian, Amharic, Arabic, Armenian, Assamese, Azerbaijani (Latin), Bangla (Bangladesh), Bangla (Bengali India), Basque, Belarusian, Bosnian (Latin), Bulgarian, Catalan, Chinese (Simplified), Chinese (Traditional), Croatian, Czech, Danish, Dari, Dutch, English, Estonian, Filipino, Finnish, French, Galician, Georgian, German, Greek, Gujarati, Hausa, Hebrew, Hindi, Hungarian, Icelandic, Igbo, Indonesian, Irish, isiXhosa, isiZulu, Italian, Japanese, Kannada, Kazakh, Khmer, Kinyarwanda, Kiswahili, Konkani, Korean, Kyrgyz, Latvian, Lithuanian, Luxembourgish, Macedonian (Macedonia), Malay (Latin), Malayalam, Maltese, Maori, Marathi, Mongolian (Cyrillic), Nepali, Norwegian (Bokmål), Norwegian (Nynorsk), Odia, Pashto, Persian (Farsi), Polish, Portuguese (Portugal), Portuguese (Brazil), Punjabi (India), Quechua, Romanian, Romansh, Russian, Scottish Gaelic, Serbian (Cyrillic, Serbia), Serbian (Latin, Serbia), Serbian (Cyrillic, Bosnia and Herzegovina), Sesotho sa Leboa, Setswana, Sindhi (Arabic), Sinhala, Slovak, Slovenian, Spanish, Swedish, Tamil, Tatar (Cyrillic), Telugu, Thai, Turkish, Turkmen (Latin), Ukrainian, Urdu, Uyghur, Uzbek (Latin), Valencian, Vietnamese, Welsh, Wolof, Yoruba
- Type: Presentation program
- License: Trialware
- Website: powerpoint.cloud.microsoft

Microsoft PowerPoint for Android OS
- PowerPoint for Android running on Android 13
- Developer: Microsoft Corporation
- Stable release: 16.0.20131.20036 / June 17, 2026; 5 months ago
- Operating system: Android Pie or later
- Type: Presentation program
- License: Proprietary commercial software
- Website: products.office.com/en-us/powerpoint

Microsoft PowerPoint for Mac
- PowerPoint for Mac (version 16.69.1), running on macOS Ventura (13.2)
- Developer: Microsoft
- Release: April 20, 1987; 39 years ago
- Stable release: 16.108.3 (Build 26050324) / May 5, 2026; 6 months ago
- Written in: C++ (back-end), Objective-C (API/UI)
- Operating system: macOS 12 or later
- Available in: 26 languages
- List of languages English, Arabic, Czech, Danish, Dutch, Finnish, French, German, Greek, Hebrew, Hungarian, Indonesian, Italian, Japanese, Korean, Norwegian Bokmål, Polish, Portuguese, Russian, Simplified Chinese, Slovak, Spanish, Swedish, Thai, Traditional Chinese, Turkish
- Type: Presentation program
- License: Proprietary commercial software

Microsoft PowerPoint for iOS
- PowerPoint for iOS running on iPadOS 26
- Developer: Microsoft Corporation
- Stable release: 2.108.3 / May 4, 2025; 18 months ago
- Operating system: iOS 18 or later IPadOS 18 or later watchOS 11 or later
- Available in: 33 languages
- List of languages English, Arabic, Catalan, Croatian, Czech, Danish, Dutch, Finnish, French, German, Greek, Hebrew, Hindi, Hungarian, Indonesian, Italian, Japanese, Korean, Malay, Norwegian Bokmål, Polish, Portuguese, Romanian, Russian, Simplified Chinese, Slovak, Spanish, Swedish, Thai, Traditional Chinese, Turkish, Ukrainian, Vietnamese
- Type: Presentation program
- License: Proprietary commercial software
- Website: products.office.com/en-us/powerpoint

PowerPoint Mobile for Windows 10
- Developer: Microsoft
- Final release: 16002.12325.20032.0 / December 10, 2019; 6 years ago
- Operating system: Windows 10, Windows 10 Mobile
- Type: Presentation program
- License: Trialware
- Website: www.microsoft.com/store/productid/9WZDNCRFJB5Q

Microsoft PowerPoint, or simply PowerPoint, is a presentation program developed by Microsoft.

It was originally created by Robert Gaskins, Tom Rudkin, and Dennis Austin at a software company named Forethought, Inc. It was released on April 20, 1987, initially for Macintosh computers only. Microsoft acquired PowerPoint for about $14 million three months after it appeared. This was Microsoft's first significant acquisition, and Microsoft set up a new business unit for PowerPoint in Silicon Valley where Forethought had been located.

PowerPoint became a component of the Microsoft Office suite, first offered in 1989 for Macintosh and in 1990 for Windows, which bundled several Microsoft apps. Beginning with PowerPoint 4.0 (1994), PowerPoint was integrated into Microsoft Office development, and adopted shared common components and a converged user interface.

PowerPoint's market share was very small at first, prior to introducing a version for Microsoft Windows, but grew rapidly with the growth of Windows and of Office. Since the late 1990s, PowerPoint's worldwide market share of presentation software has been estimated at 95 percent.

PowerPoint was originally designed to provide visuals for group presentations within business organizations, but has come to be widely used in other communication situations in business and beyond. The wider use led to the development of the PowerPoint presentation as a new form of communication, with strong reactions including advice that it should be used less, differently, or better.

The first PowerPoint version (Macintosh, 1987) was used to produce overhead transparencies, the second (Macintosh, 1988; Windows, 1990) could also produce color 35 mm slides. The third version (Windows and Macintosh, 1992) introduced video output of virtual slideshows to digital projectors, which would over time replace physical transparencies and slides. A dozen major versions since then have added additional features and modes of operation and have made PowerPoint available beyond Apple Macintosh and Microsoft Windows, adding versions for iOS, Android, and web access.

== History ==
=== Creation at Forethought (1984–1987) ===
PowerPoint was created by Robert Gaskins and Dennis Austin at a software startup in Silicon Valley named Forethought, Inc. Forethought had been founded in 1983 to create an integrated environment and applications for future personal computers that would provide a graphical user interface, but it had run into difficulties requiring a "restart" and new plan.

On July 5, 1984, Forethought hired Robert Gaskins as its vice president of product development to create a new application that would be especially suited to the new graphical personal computers, such as the Apple Macintosh and later Microsoft Windows. Gaskins produced his initial description of PowerPoint about a month later (August 14, 1984) in the form of a 2-page document titled "Presentation Graphics for Overhead Projection." By October 1984, Gaskins had selected Dennis Austin to be the developer for PowerPoint. Gaskins and Austin worked together on the definition and design of the new product for nearly a year, and produced the first specification document dated August 21, 1985. This first design document showed a product as it would look in Microsoft Windows 1.0, which at that time had not been released.

Development from that spec was begun by Austin in November 1985, for Macintosh first. About six months later, on May 1, 1986, Gaskins and Austin chose a second developer to join the project, Thomas Rudkin. Gaskins prepared two final product specification marketing documents in June 1986; these described a product for both Macintosh and Windows. At about the same time, Austin, Rudkin, and Gaskins produced a second and final major design specification document, this time showing a Macintosh look.

Throughout this development period, the product was called "Presenter". Then, just before release, there was a last-minute check with Forethought's lawyers to register the name as a trademark, and "Presenter" was unexpectedly rejected because it had already been used by someone else. Gaskins says that he thought of "PowerPoint", based on the product's goal of "empowering" individual presenters, and sent that name to the lawyers for clearance, while all the documentation was hastily revised.

Funding to complete development of PowerPoint was assured in mid-January 1987, when a new Apple Computer venture capital fund, called Apple's Strategic Investment Group, selected PowerPoint to be its first investment. A month later, on February 22, 1987, Forethought announced PowerPoint at the Personal Computer Forum in Phoenix; John Sculley, the CEO of Apple, appeared at the announcement and said "We see desktop presentation as potentially a bigger market for Apple than desktop publishing."

PowerPoint 1.0 for Macintosh shipped from manufacturing on April 20, 1987, and the first production run of 10,000 units was sold out.

=== Acquisition by Microsoft (1987–1992) ===
By early 1987, Microsoft was starting to plan a new application to create presentations, an activity led by Jeff Raikes, who was head of marketing for the Applications Division. Microsoft assigned an internal group to write a specification and plan for a new presentation product. They contemplated an acquisition to speed up development, and in early 1987 Microsoft sent a letter of intent to acquire Dave Winer's product called MORE, an outlining program that could print its outlines as bullet charts. During this preparatory activity Raikes discovered that a program specifically to make overhead presentations was already being developed by Forethought, Inc., and that it was nearly completed. Raikes and others visited Forethought on February 6, 1987, for a confidential demonstration.

Raikes later recounted his reaction to seeing PowerPoint and his report about it to Bill Gates, who was initially skeptical:

I thought, "software to do overheads—that's a great idea." I came back to see Bill. I said, "Bill, I think we really ought to do this;" and Bill said, "No, no, no, no, no, that's just a feature of Microsoft Word, just put it into Word." ... And I kept saying, "Bill, no, it's not just a feature of Microsoft Word, it's a whole genre of how people do these presentations." And, to his credit, he listened to me and ultimately allowed me to go forward and ... buy this company in Silicon Valley called Forethought, for the product known as PowerPoint.

When PowerPoint was released by Forethought, its initial press was favorable; the Wall Street Journal reported on early reactions: "'I see about one product a year I get this excited about,' says Amy Hora, a consultant in Bala Cynwyd, Pa. 'People will buy a Macintosh just to get access to this product.'"

On April 28, 1987, a week after shipment, a group of Microsoft's senior executives spent another day at Forethought to hear about initial PowerPoint sales on Macintosh and plans for Windows. The following day, Microsoft sent a letter to Dave Winer withdrawing its earlier letter of intent to acquire his company, and in mid-May 1987 Microsoft sent a letter of intent to acquire Forethought. As requested in that letter of intent, Robert Gaskins from Forethought went to Redmond for a one-on-one meeting with Bill Gates in early June 1987, and by the end of July an agreement was concluded for an acquisition. The New York Times reported:

... July 30, 1987— The Microsoft Corporation announced its first significant software acquisition today, paying $14 million [$39.7 million in present-day terms] for Forethought Inc. of Sunnyvale, Calif. Forethought makes a program called PowerPoint that allows users of Apple Macintosh computers to make overhead transparencies or flip charts. ... [T]he acquisition of Forethought is the first significant one for Microsoft, which is based in Redmond, Wash. Forethought would remain in Sunnyvale, giving Microsoft a Silicon Valley presence. The unit will be headed by Robert Gaskins, Forethought's vice president of product development.

Microsoft's president Jon Shirley offered his company's motivation for the acquisition: "'We made this deal primarily because of our belief in desktop presentations as a product category. ... Forethought was first to market with a product in this category.'" Microsoft had 50% market share in Macintosh applications, and led in three categories; Raikes said that after the acquisition it would lead in five categories. (Forethought distributed the database Filemaker, which Microsoft wanted to continue marketing.) The company intended for Forethought to be its Silicon Valley base to develop and market future graphics software, so set up within its Applications Division, an independent "Graphics Business Unit" for PowerPoint, the first Microsoft application group distant from the main Redmond location. The company hoped to hire employees uninterested in living in Washington state; by 1987 more than 90% of Microsoft developers came from outside Seattle. All the PowerPoint people from Forethought joined Microsoft, and the new location was headed by Robert Gaskins, with Dennis Austin and Thomas Rudkin leading development. PowerPoint 1.0 for Macintosh was modified to indicate the new Microsoft ownership and continued to be sold. A year after the acquisition, Gaskins reported that all seven Forethought PowerPoint employees had stayed with Microsoft, and the Graphics Business Unit had hired 12 employees, many of whom did not want to move to Redmond. The GBU had moved to a new location on Sand Hill Road in Menlo Park, California; it was much larger than needed for 19 people, but Gaskins wrote that he and Microsoft wanted future capacity as the company grew in Silicon Valley.

A new PowerPoint 2.0 for Macintosh, adding color 35 mm slides, shipped in May 1988, and again received good reviews. The same PowerPoint 2.0 product re-developed for Windows was shipped two years later, in mid-1990, at the same time as Windows 3.0. Much of the color technology was the result of a joint development partnership with Genigraphics, the dominant presentation services company.

PowerPoint 3.0, which was shipped in 1992 for both Windows and Mac, added live video for projectors and monitors, with the result that PowerPoint was thereafter used for delivering presentations as well as for preparing them. This was at first an alternative to overhead transparencies and 35 mm slides, but over time would come to replace them.

=== Part of Microsoft Office (since 1993) ===
PowerPoint had been included in Microsoft Office from the beginning. PowerPoint 2.0 for Macintosh was part of the first Office bundle for Macintosh which was offered in mid-1989. When PowerPoint 2.0 for Windows appeared, a year later, it was part of a similar Office bundle for Windows, which was offered in late 1990. Both of these were bundling promotions, in which the independent applications were packaged together and offered for a lower total price.

PowerPoint 3.0 (1992) was again separately specified and developed, and was advertised and sold separately from Office. It was, as before, included in Microsoft Office 3.0, both for Windows and the corresponding version for Macintosh.

A plan to integrate the applications themselves more tightly had been indicated as early as February 1991, toward the end of PowerPoint 3.0 development, in an internal memo by Bill Gates:

Another important question is what portion of our applications sales over time will be a set of applications versus a single product. ... Please assume that we stay ahead in integrating our family together in evaluating our future strategies—the product teams WILL deliver on this. ... I believe that we should position the "OFFICE" as our most important application.

The move from bundling separate products to integrated development began with PowerPoint 4.0, developed in 1993–1994 under new management from Redmond. The PowerPoint group in Silicon Valley was reorganized from the independent "Graphics Business Unit" (GBU) to become the "Graphics Product Unit" (GPU) for Office, and PowerPoint 4.0 changed to adopt a converged user interface and other components shared with the other apps in Office.

When it was released, the computer press reported on the change approvingly: "PowerPoint 4.0 has been re-engineered from the ground up to resemble and work with the latest applications in Office: Word 6.0, Excel 5.0, and Access 2.0. The integration is so good, you'll have to look twice to make sure you're running PowerPoint and not Word or Excel." Office integration was further underscored in the following version, PowerPoint 95, which was given the version number PowerPoint 7.0 (skipping 5.0 and 6.0) so that all the components of Office would share the same major version number.

Although PowerPoint by this point had become part of the integrated Microsoft Office product, its development remained in Silicon Valley. Succeeding versions of PowerPoint introduced important changes, particularly version 12.0 (2007) which had a very different shared Office "ribbon" user interface, and a new shared Office XML-based file format. This marked the 20th anniversary of PowerPoint, and Microsoft held an event to commemorate that anniversary at its Silicon Valley Campus for the PowerPoint team there. Special guests were Robert Gaskins, Dennis Austin, and Thomas Rudkin, and the featured speaker was Jeff Raikes, all from PowerPoint 1.0 days, 20 years before.

Since then major development of PowerPoint as part of Office has continued. New development techniques (shared across Office) for PowerPoint 2016 have made it possible to ship versions of PowerPoint 2016 for Windows, Mac, iOS, Android, and web access nearly simultaneously, and to release new features on an almost monthly schedule. PowerPoint development is still carried out in Silicon Valley as of 2017.

In 2010, Jeff Raikes, who had most recently been President of the Business Division of Microsoft (including responsibility for Office), observed: "of course, today we know that PowerPoint is oftentimes the number two—or in some cases even the number one—most-used tool" among the applications in Office.

=== Sales and market share ===
PowerPoint's initial sales were about 40,000 copies sold in 1987 (nine months), about 85,000 copies in 1988, and about 100,000 copies in 1989, all for Macintosh. Computer Intelligence estimated that year that Microsoft had 6% of the Fortune 1000 PC presentation software market, third to Ashton-Tate's 40% and Lotus Development's 20%. PowerPoint's market share in its first three years was a tiny part of the total presentation market, which was very heavily dominated by MS-DOS applications on PCs. The market leaders on MS-DOS in 1988–1989 were Harvard Graphics (introduced by Software Publishing in 1986) in first place, and Lotus Freelance Plus (also introduced in 1986) as a strong second. They were competing with more than a dozen other MS-DOS presentation products, and Microsoft did not develop a PowerPoint version for MS-DOS. After three years, PowerPoint sales were disappointing. Jeff Raikes, who had bought PowerPoint for Microsoft, later recalled: "By 1990, it looked like it wasn't a very smart idea [for Microsoft to have acquired PowerPoint], because not very many people were using PowerPoint."

This began to change when the first version for Windows, PowerPoint 2.0, brought sales up to about 200,000 copies in 1990 and to about 375,000 copies in 1991, with Windows units outselling Macintosh. PowerPoint sold about 1 million copies in 1992, of which about 80 percent were for Windows and about 20 percent for Macintosh, and in 1992 PowerPoint's market share of worldwide presentation graphics software sales was reported as 63 percent. By the last six months of 1992, PowerPoint revenue was running at a rate of over $100 million annually ($283 million in present-day terms).

Sales of PowerPoint 3.0 doubled to about 2 million copies in 1993, of which about 90 percent were for Windows and about 10 percent for Macintosh, and in 1993 PowerPoint's market share of worldwide presentation graphics software sales was reported as 78 percent. In both years, about half of total revenue came from sales outside the U.S.

By 1997 PowerPoint sales had doubled again, to more than 4 million copies annually, representing 85 percent of the world market. Also in 1997, an internal publication from the PowerPoint group said that by then over 20 million copies of PowerPoint were in use, and that total revenues from PowerPoint over its first ten years (1987 to 1996) had already exceeded $1 billion.

Since the late 1990s, PowerPoint's market share of total world presentation software has been estimated at 95 percent by both industry and academic sources.

== Operation ==
The earliest version of PowerPoint (1987 for Macintosh) could be used to print black and white pages to be photocopied onto sheets of transparent film for projection from overhead projectors, and to print speaker's notes and audience handouts; the next version (1988 for Macintosh, 1990 for Windows) was extended to also produce color 35mm slides by communicating a file over a modem to a Genigraphics imaging center with slides returned by overnight delivery for projection from slide projectors. PowerPoint was used for planning and preparing a presentation, but not for delivering it (apart from previewing it on a computer screen, or distributing printed paper copies). The operation of PowerPoint changed substantially in its third version (1992 for Windows and Macintosh), when PowerPoint was extended to also deliver a presentation by producing direct video output to digital projectors or large monitors. In 1992 video projection of presentations was rare and expensive, and practically unknown from a laptop computer. Robert Gaskins, one of the creators of PowerPoint, says he publicly demonstrated that use for the first time at a large Microsoft meeting held in Paris on February 25, 1992, by using an unreleased development build of PowerPoint 3.0 running on an early pre-production sample of a powerful new color laptop and feeding a professional auditorium video projector.

By about 2003, ten years later, digital projection had become the dominant mode of use, replacing transparencies and 35mm slides and their projectors. As a result, the meaning of "PowerPoint presentation" narrowed to mean specifically digital projection:

... in the business lexicon, "PowerPoint presentation" had come to refer to a presentation made using a PowerPoint slideshow projected from a computer. Although the PowerPoint software had been used to generate transparencies for over a decade, this usage was not typically encompassed by a common understanding of the term.

In contemporary operation, PowerPoint is used to create a file (called a "presentation" or "deck") containing a sequence of pages (called "slides" in the app) which usually have a consistent style (from template masters), and which may contain information imported from other apps or created in PowerPoint, including text, bullet lists, tables, charts, drawn shapes, images, audio clips, video clips, animations of elements, and animated transitions between slides, plus attached notes for each slide.

After such a file is created, typical operation is to present it as a slide show using a portable computer, where the presentation file is stored on the computer or available from a network, and the computer's screen shows a "presenter view" with current slide, next slide, speaker's notes for the current slide, and other information. Video is sent from the computer to one or more external digital projectors or monitors, showing only the current slide to the audience, with sequencing controlled by the speaker at the computer. A smartphone remote control built in to PowerPoint for iOS (optionally controlled from Apple Watch) and for Android allows the presenter to control the show from elsewhere in the room.

In addition to a computer slide show projected to a live audience by a speaker, PowerPoint can be used to deliver a presentation in a number of other ways:

- Displayed on the screen of the presentation computer or tablet (for a very small group)
- Printed for distribution as paper documents (in several formats)
- Distributed as files for private viewing, even on computers without PowerPoint
- Packaged for distribution on CD or a network, including linked and embedded data
- Transmitted as a live broadcast presentation over the web
- Embedded in a web page or blog
- Shared on social networks such as Facebook or Twitter
- Set up as a self-running unattended display
- Recorded as video/audio (H.264/AAC), to be distributed as for any other video

Some of these ways of using PowerPoint have been studied by JoAnne Yates and Wanda Orlikowski of the MIT Sloan School of Management:

The standard form of such presentations involves a single person standing before a group of people, talking and using the PowerPoint slideshow to project visual aids onto a screen. ... In practice, however, presentations are not always delivered in this mode. In our studies, we often found that the presenter sat at a table with a small group of people and walked them through a "deck", composed of paper copies of the slides. In some cases, decks were simply distributed to individuals, without even a walk-through or discussion. ... Other variations in the form included sending the PowerPoint file electronically to another site and talking through the slides over an audio or video channel (e.g., telephone or video conference) as both parties viewed the slides. ... Another common variation was placing a PowerPoint file on a web site for people to view at different times.

They found that some of these ways of using PowerPoint could influence the content of presentations, for example when "the slides themselves have to carry more of the substance of the presentation, and thus need considerably more content than they would have if they were intended for projection by a speaker who would orally provide additional details and nuance about content and context."

== Other platforms ==
=== PowerPoint for mobile phones ===
PowerPoint Mobile is included with Windows Mobile 5.0. It is a presentation program capable of reading and editing Microsoft PowerPoint presentations, although authoring abilities are limited to adding notes, editing text, and rearranging slides. It can't create new presentations. Versions of PowerPoint Mobile for Windows Phone 7 can also watch presentation broadcasts streamed from the Internet. In 2015, Microsoft released PowerPoint Mobile for Windows 10 as a universal app. In this version of PowerPoint users can create and edit new presentations, present, and share their PowerPoint documents.

=== PowerPoint for the web ===
PowerPoint for the web is a free lightweight version of Microsoft PowerPoint available as part of Office on the web, which also includes web versions of Microsoft Excel and Microsoft Word.

PowerPoint for the web does not support inserting or editing charts, equations, or audio or video stored on your PC, but they are all displayed in the presentation if they were added in using a desktop app. Some elements, like WordArt effects or more advanced animations and transitions, are not displayed at all, although they are preserved in the document. PowerPoint for the web also lacks the Outline, Master, Slide Sorter, and Presenter views present in the desktop app, as well as having limited printing options.

== Cultural impact ==
=== Business uses ===
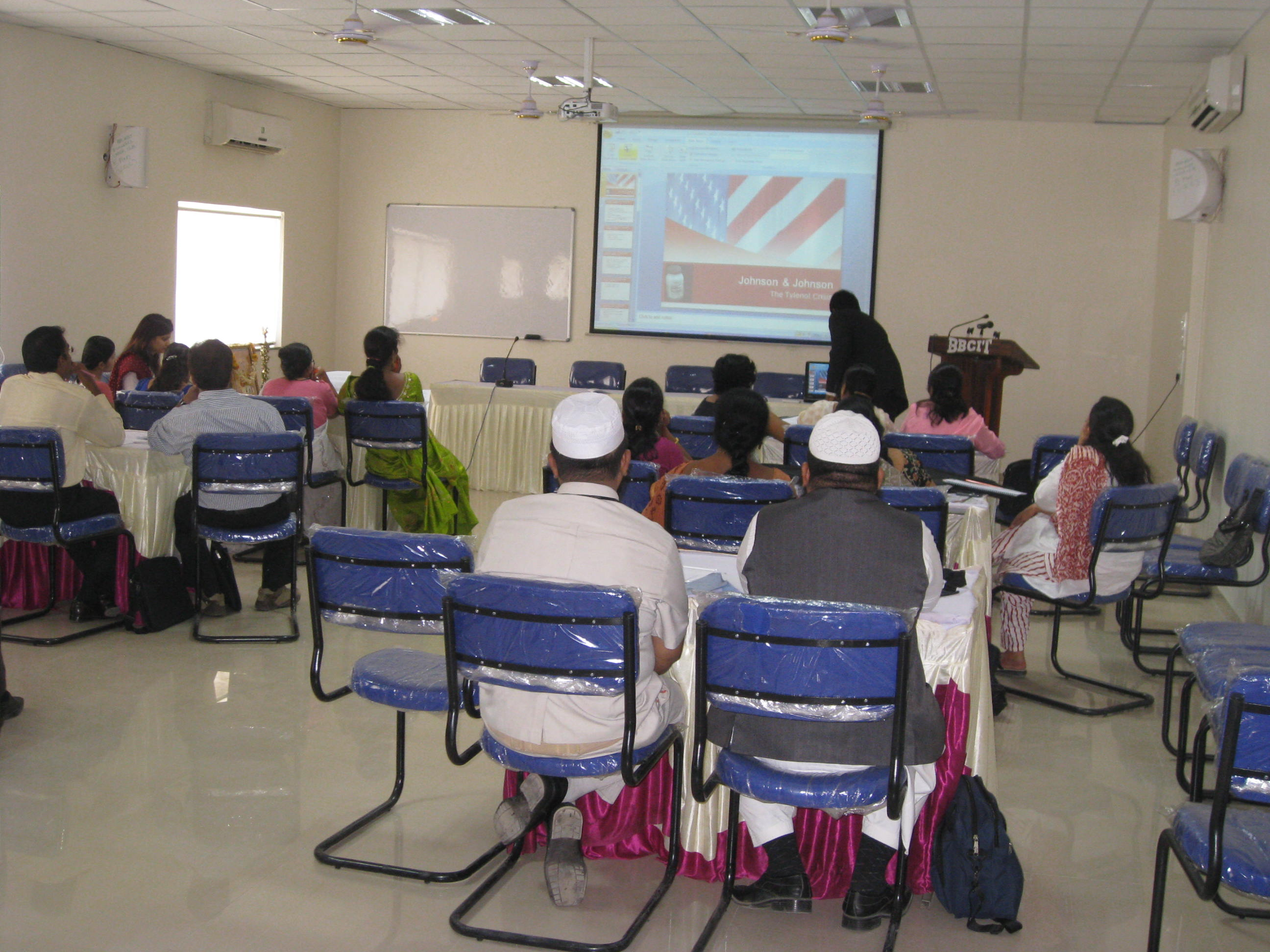
A PowerPoint business presentation in progress

PowerPoint was originally targeted just for business presentations. Robert Gaskins, who was responsible for its design, has written about his intended customers: "... I did not target other existing large groups of users of presentations, such as school teachers or military officers. ... I also did not plan to target people who were not existing users of presentations ... such as clergy and school children ... . Our focus was purely on business users, in small and large companies, from one person to the largest multinationals." Business people had for a long time made presentations for sales calls and for internal company communications, and PowerPoint produced the same formats in the same style and for the same purposes.

PowerPoint use in business grew over its first five years (1987–1992) to sales of about 1 million copies annually, for worldwide market share of 63 percent. Over the following five years (1992–1997) PowerPoint sales accelerated, to a rate of about 4 million copies annually, for worldwide market share of 85 percent. The increase in business use has been attributed to "network effects", whereby additional users of PowerPoint in a company or an industry increased its salience and value to other users.

Not everyone immediately approved of the greater use of PowerPoint for presentations, even in business. CEOs who very early were reported to discourage or ban PowerPoint presentations at internal business meetings included Lou Gerstner (at IBM, in 1993), Scott McNealy (at Sun Microsystems, in 1996), and Steve Jobs (at Apple, in 1997). But even so, Rich Gold, a scholar who studied corporate presentation use at Xerox PARC, could write in 1999: "Within today's corporation, if you want to communicate an idea ... you use PowerPoint."

=== Uses beyond business ===
At the same time that PowerPoint was becoming dominant in business settings, it was also being adopted for uses beyond business: "Personal computing ... scaled up the production of presentations. ... The result has been the rise of presentation culture. In an information society, nearly everyone presents."

In 1998, at about the same time that Gold was pronouncing PowerPoint's ubiquity in business, the influential Bell Labs engineer Robert W. Lucky could already write about broader uses:

... the world has run amok with the giddy power of presentation graphics. A new language is in the air, and it is codified in PowerPoint. ... In a family discussion about what to do on a given evening, for example, I feel like pulling out my laptop and giving a Vugraph presentation... In church, I am surprised that the preachers haven't caught on yet. ... How have we gotten on so long without PowerPoint?

Over a decade or so, beginning in the mid-1990s, PowerPoint began to be used in many communication situations, well beyond its original business presentation uses, to include teaching in schools and in universities, lecturing in scientific meetings (and preparing their related poster sessions), worshipping in churches, making legal arguments in courtrooms, displaying supertitles in theaters, driving helmet-mounted displays in spacesuits for NASA astronauts, giving military briefings, issuing governmental reports, undertaking diplomatic negotiations, writing novels, giving architectural demonstrations, prototyping website designs, creating animated video games, editing images, creating art projects, and even as a substitute for writing engineering technical reports, and as an organizing tool for writing general business documents.

By 2003, it seemed that PowerPoint was being used everywhere. Julia Keller reported for the Chicago Tribune:

PowerPoint ... is one of the most pervasive and ubiquitous technological tools ever concocted. In less than a decade, it has revolutionized the worlds of business, education, science, and communications, swiftly becoming the standard for just about anybody who wants to explain just about anything to just about anybody else. From corporate middle managers reporting on production goals to 4th-graders fashioning a show-and-tell on the French and Indian War to church pastors explicating the seven deadly sins ... PowerPoint seems poised for world domination.

=== Cultural reactions ===
As uses broadened, cultural awareness of PowerPoint grew and commentary about it began to appear. "With the widespread adoption of PowerPoint came complaints ... often very general statements reflecting dissatisfaction with modern media and communication practices as well as the dysfunctions of organizational culture." Indications of this awareness included increasing mentions of PowerPoint use in the Dilbert comic strips of Scott Adams, comic parodies of poor or inappropriate use such as the Gettysburg Address in PowerPoint or summaries of Shakespeare's Hamlet and Nabokov's Lolita in PowerPoint, and a vast number of publications on the general subject of PowerPoint, especially about how to use it.

Out of all the analyses of PowerPoint over a quarter of a century, at least three general themes emerged as categories of reaction to its broader use: (1) "Use it less": avoid PowerPoint in favor of alternatives, such as using more-complex graphics and written prose, or using nothing; (2) "Use it differently": make a major change to a PowerPoint style that is simpler and pictorial, turning the presentation toward a performance, more like a Steve Jobs keynote; and (3) "Use it better": retain much of the conventional PowerPoint style but learn to avoid making many kinds of mistakes that can interfere with communication.

==== Use it less ====
An early reaction was that the broader use of PowerPoint was a mistake, and should be reversed. An influential example of this came from Edward Tufte, an authority on information design, who has been a professor of political science, statistics, and computer science at Princeton and Yale, but is best known for his self-published books on data visualization, which have sold nearly 2 million copies as of 2014.

In 2003, he published a widely-read booklet titled The Cognitive Style of PowerPoint, revised in 2006. Tufte found a number of problems with the "cognitive style" of PowerPoint, many of which he attributed to the standard default style templates:

PowerPoint's convenience for some presenters is costly to the content and the audience. These costs arise from the cognitive style characteristics of the standard default PP presentation: foreshortening of evidence and thought, low spatial resolution, an intensely hierarchical single-path structure as the model for organizing every type of content, breaking up narratives and data into slides and minimal fragments, rapid temporal sequencing of thin information rather than focused spatial analysis, conspicuous chartjunk and PP Phluff, branding of slides with logotypes, a preoccupation with format not content, incompetent designs for data graphics and tables, and a smirky commercialism that turns information into a sales pitch and presenters into marketeers [italics in original].

Tufte particularly advised against using PowerPoint for reporting scientific analyses, using as a dramatic example some slides made during the flight of the space shuttle Columbia after it had been damaged by an accident at liftoff, slides which poorly communicated the engineers' limited understanding of what had happened. For such technical presentations, and for most occasions apart from its initial domain of sales presentations, Tufte advised against using PowerPoint at all; in many situations, according to Tufte, it would be better to substitute high-resolution graphics or concise prose documents as handouts for the audience to study and discuss, providing a great deal more detail.

Many commentators enthusiastically joined in Tufte's vivid criticism of PowerPoint uses, and at a conference held in 2013 (a decade after Tufte's booklet appeared) one paper claimed that "Despite all the criticism about his work, Tufte can be considered as the single most influential author in the discourse on PowerPoint. ... While his approach was not rigorous from a research perspective, his articles received wide resonance with the public at large ... ." There were also others who disagreed with Tufte's assertion that the PowerPoint program reduces the quality of presenters' thoughts: Steven Pinker, professor of psychology at MIT and later Harvard, had earlier argued that "If anything, PowerPoint, if used well, would ideally reflect the way we think." Pinker later reinforced this opinion: "Any general opposition to PowerPoint is just dumb, ... It's like denouncing lectures—before there were awful PowerPoint presentations, there were awful scripted lectures, unscripted lectures, slide shows, chalk talks, and so on."

Much of the early commentary, on all sides, was "informal" and "anecdotal", because empirical research had been limited.

==== Use it differently ====
A second reaction to PowerPoint use was to say that PowerPoint can be used well, but only by substantially changing its style of use. This reaction is exemplified by Richard E. Mayer, a professor of psychology at the University of California, Santa Barbara, who has studied cognition and learning, particularly the design of educational multimedia, and who has published more than 500 publications, including over 30 books. Mayer's theme has been that "In light of the science, it is up to us to make a fundamental shift in our thinking—we can no longer expect people to struggle to try to adapt to our PowerPoint habits. Instead, we have to change our PowerPoint habits to align with the way people learn."

Tufte had argued his judgment that the information density of text on PowerPoint slides was too low, perhaps only 40 words on a slide, leading to over-simplified messages; Mayer responded that his empirical research showed exactly the opposite, that the amount of text on PowerPoint slides was usually too high, and that even fewer than 40 words on a slide resulted in "PowerPoint overload" that impeded understanding during presentations.

Mayer suggested a few major changes from traditional PowerPoint formats:

- replacing brief slide titles with longer "headlines" expressing complete ideas;
- showing more slides but simpler ones;
- removing almost all text including nearly all bullet lists (reserving the text for the spoken narration);
- using larger, higher-quality, and more important graphics and photographs;
- removing all extraneous decoration, backgrounds, logos and identifications, everything but the essential message.

Mayer's ideas are claimed by Carmine Gallo to have been reflected in Steve Jobs's presentations: "Mayer outlined fundamental principles of multimedia design based on what scientists know about cognitive functioning. Steve Jobs's slides adhere to each of Mayer's principles ... ." Though not unique to Jobs, many people saw the style for the first time in Jobs's famous product introductions. Steve Jobs would have been using Apple's Keynote, which was designed for Jobs's own slide shows beginning in 2003, but Gallo says that "speaking like Jobs has little to do with the type of presentation software you use (PowerPoint, Keynote, etc.) ... all the techniques apply equally to PowerPoint and Keynote." Gallo adds that "Microsoft's PowerPoint has one big advantage over Apple's Keynote presentation software—it's everywhere ... it's safe to say that the number of Keynote presentations is minuscule in comparison with PowerPoint. Although most presentation designers who are familiar with both formats prefer to work in the more elegant Keynote system, those same designers will tell you that the majority of their client work is done in PowerPoint."

Consistent with its association with Steve Jobs's keynotes, a response to this style has been that it is particularly effective for "ballroom-style presentations" (as often given in conference center ballrooms) where a celebrated and practiced speaker addresses a large passive audience, but less appropriate for "conference room-style presentations" which are often recurring internal business meetings for in-depth discussion with motivated counterparts.

==== Use it better ====
A third reaction to PowerPoint use was to conclude that the standard style is capable of being used well, but that many small points need to be executed carefully, to avoid impeding understanding. This kind of analysis is particularly associated with Stephen Kosslyn, a cognitive neuroscientist who specializes in the psychology of learning and visual communication, and who has been head of the department of psychology at Harvard, has been Director of Stanford's Center for Advanced Study in the Behavioral Sciences, and has published some 300 papers and 14 books.

Kosslyn presented a set of psychological principles of "human perception, memory, and comprehension" that "appears to capture the major points of agreement among researchers." He reports that his experiments support the idea that it is not intuitive or obvious how to create effective PowerPoint presentations that conform to those agreed principles, and that even small differences that might not seem significant to a presenter can produce very different results in audiences' understanding. For this reason, Kosslyn says, users need specific education to be able to identify best ways to avoid "flaws and failures":

Specifically, we hypothesized and found that the psychological principles are often violated in PowerPoint slideshows across different fields ..., that some types of presentation flaws are noticeable and annoying to audience members ..., and that observers have difficulty identifying many violations in graphical displays in individual slides ... . These studies converge in painting the following picture: PowerPoint presentations are commonly flawed; some types of flaws are more common than others; flaws are not isolated to one domain or context; and, although some types of flaws annoy the audience, flaws at the level of slide design are not always obvious to an untrained observer ... .

The many "flaws and failures" identified were those "likely to disrupt the comprehension or memory of the material." Among the most common examples were "Bulleted items are not presented individually, growing the list from the top to the bottom," "More than four bulleted items appear in a single list," "More than two lines are used per bulleted sentence," and "Words are not large enough (i.e., greater than 20 point) to be easily seen." Among audience reactions common problems reported were "Speakers read word-for-word from notes or from the slides themselves," "The slides contained too much material to absorb before the next slide was presented," and "The main point was obscured by lots of irrelevant detail."

Kosslyn observes that these findings could help to explain why the many studies of the instructional effectiveness of PowerPoint have been inconclusive and conflicting, if there were differences in the quality of the presentations tested in different studies that went unobserved because "many may feel that 'good design' is intuitively clear."

In 2007 Kosslyn wrote a book about PowerPoint, in which he suggested a very large number of fairly modest changes to PowerPoint styles and gave advice on recommended ways of using PowerPoint. In a later second book about PowerPoint he suggested nearly 150 clarifying style changes (in fewer than 150 pages). Kosslyn summarizes:

... there's nothing fundamentally wrong with the PowerPoint program as a medium; rather, I claim that the problem lies in how it is used. ... In fact, this medium is a remarkably versatile tool that can be extraordinarily effective. ... For many purposes, PowerPoint presentations are a superior medium of communication, which is why they have become standard in so many fields.

In 2017, an online poll of social media users in the UK was reported to show that PowerPoint "remains as popular with young tech-savvy users as it is with the Baby Boomers," with about four out of five saying that "PowerPoint was a great tool for making presentations," in part because "PowerPoint, with its capacity to be highly visual, bridges the wordy world of yesterday with the visual future of tomorrow."

Also in 2017, the Managerial Communication Group of MIT Sloan School of Management polled their incoming MBA students, finding that "results underscore just how differently this generation communicates as compared with older workers." Fewer than half of respondents reported doing any meaningful, longer-form writing at work, and even that minority mostly did so very infrequently, but "85 percent of students named producing presentations as a meaningful part of their job responsibilities. Two-thirds report that they present on a daily or weekly basis—so it's no surprise that in-person presentations is the top skill they hope to improve." One of the researchers concluded: "We're not likely to see future workplaces with long-form writing. The trend is toward presentations and slides, and we don't see any sign of that slowing down."

=== U.S. military excess ===
Use of PowerPoint by the U.S. military services began slowly, because they were invested in mainframe computers, MS-DOS PCs and specialized military-specification graphic output devices, all of which PowerPoint did not support. But because of the strong military tradition of presenting briefings, as soon as they acquired the computers needed to run it, PowerPoint became part of the U.S. military.

By 2000, ten years after PowerPoint for Windows appeared, it was already identified as an important feature of U.S. armed forces culture, in a front-page story in the Wall Street Journal:

Old-fashioned slide briefings, designed to update generals on troop movements, have been a staple of the military since World War II. But in only a few short years PowerPoint has altered the landscape. Just as word processing made it easier to produce long, meandering memos, the spread of PowerPoint has unleashed a blizzard of jazzy but often incoherent visuals. Instead of drawing up a dozen slides on a legal pad and running them over to the graphics department, captains and colonels now can create hundreds of slides in a few hours without ever leaving their desks. If the spirit moves them they can build in gunfire sound effects and images that explode like land mines. ... PowerPoint has become such an ingrained part of the defense culture that it has seeped into the military lexicon. "PowerPoint Ranger" is a derogatory term for a desk-bound bureaucrat more adept at making slides than tossing grenades.

U.S. military use of PowerPoint may have influenced its use by armed forces of other countries: "Foreign armed services also are beginning to get in on the act. 'You can't speak with the U.S. military without knowing PowerPoint,' says Margaret Hayes, an instructor at National Defense University in Washington D.C., who teaches Latin American military officers how to use the software."

After another 10 years, in 2010 (and again on its front page) the New York Times reported that PowerPoint use in the military was then "a military tool that has spun out of control":

Like an insurgency, PowerPoint has crept into the daily lives of military commanders and reached the level of near obsession. The amount of time expended on PowerPoint, the Microsoft presentation program of computer-generated charts, graphs and bullet points, has made it a running joke in the Pentagon and in Iraq and Afghanistan. ... Commanders say that behind all the PowerPoint jokes are serious concerns that the program stifles discussion, critical thinking and thoughtful decision-making. Not least, it ties up junior officers ... in the daily preparation of slides, be it for a Joint Staff meeting in Washington or for a platoon leader's pre-mission combat briefing in a remote pocket of Afghanistan.

The New York Times account went on to say that as a result some U.S. generals had banned the use of PowerPoint in their operations:

"PowerPoint makes us stupid," Gen. James N. Mattis of the Marine Corps, the Joint Forces commander, said this month at a military conference in North Carolina. (He spoke without PowerPoint.) Brig. Gen. H. R. McMaster, who banned PowerPoint presentations when he led the successful effort to secure the northern Iraqi city of Tal Afar in 2005, followed up at the same conference by likening PowerPoint to an internal threat. "It's dangerous because it can create the illusion of understanding and the illusion of control," General McMaster said in a telephone interview afterward. "Some problems in the world are not bullet-izable."

Several incidents, about the same time, gave wide currency to discussions by serving military officers describing excessive PowerPoint use and the organizational culture that encouraged it. In response to the New York Times story, Peter Norvig and Stephen M. Kosslyn sent a joint letter to the editor stressing the institutional culture of the military: "... many military personnel bemoan the overuse and misuse of PowerPoint. ... The problem is not in the tool itself, but in the way that people use it—which is partly a result of how institutions promote misuse."

The two generals who had been mentioned in 2010 as opposing the institutional culture of excessive PowerPoint use were both in the news again in 2017, when James N. Mattis became U.S. Secretary of Defense, and H. R. McMaster was appointed as U.S. National Security Advisor.

=== Artistic medium ===
Musician David Byrne has been using PowerPoint as a medium for art for years, producing a book and DVD and showing at galleries his PowerPoint-based artwork. Byrne has written: "I have been working with PowerPoint, the ubiquitous presentation software, as an art medium for a number of years. It started off as a joke (this software is a symbol of corporate salesmanship, or lack thereof) but then the work took on a life of its own as I realized I could create pieces that were moving, despite the limitations of the 'medium.'"

In 2005 Byrne toured with a theater piece styled as a PowerPoint presentation. When he presented it in Berkeley, on March 8, 2005, the University of California news service reported: "Byrne also defended [PowerPoint's] appeal as more than just a business tool—as a medium for art and theater. His talk was titled 'I ♥ PowerPoint'. Berkeley alumnus Bob Gaskins and Dennis Austin were in the audience. Eventually, Byrne said, PowerPoint could be the foundation for 'presentational theater,' with roots in Brechtian drama and Asian puppet theater." After that performance, Byrne described it in his own online journal: "Did the PowerPoint talk in Berkeley for an audience of IT legends and academics. I was terrified. The guys that originally turned PowerPoint into a program were there, what were THEY gonna think? ... [Gaskins] did tell me afterwards that he liked the PowerPoint as theater idea, which was a relief."

The expressions "PowerPoint Art" or "pptArt" are used to define a contemporary Italian artistic movement which believes that the corporate world can be a unique and exceptional source of inspiration for the artist. They say: "The pptArt name refers to PowerPoint, the symbolic and abstract language developed by the corporate world which has become a universal and highly symbolic communication system beyond cultures and borders."

The wide use of PowerPoint had, by 2010, given rise to " ... a subculture of PowerPoint enthusiasts [that] is teaching the old application new tricks, and may even be turning a dry presentation format into a full-fledged artistic medium," by using PowerPoint animation to create "games, artworks, anime, and movies."

== PowerPoint Viewer ==
PowerPoint Viewer is the name for a series of small free application programs to be used on computers without PowerPoint installed, to view, project, or print (but not create or edit) presentations.

The first version was introduced with PowerPoint 3.0 in 1992, to enable electronic presentations to be projected using conference-room computers and to be freely distributed; on Windows, it took advantage of the new feature of embedding TrueType fonts within PowerPoint presentation files to make such distribution easier. The same kind of viewer app was shipped with PowerPoint 3.0 for Macintosh, also in 1992.

Beginning with PowerPoint 2003, a feature called "Package for CD" automatically managed all linked video and audio files plus needed fonts when exporting a presentation to a disk or flash drive or network location, and also included a copy of a revised PowerPoint Viewer application so that the result could be presented on other PCs without installing anything.

The latest version that runs on Windows "was created in conjunction with PowerPoint 2010, but it can also be used to view newer presentations created in PowerPoint 2013 and PowerPoint 2016. ... All transitions, videos and effects appear and behave the same when viewed using PowerPoint Viewer as they do when viewed in PowerPoint 2010." It supports presentations created using PowerPoint 97 and later. The latest version that runs on Macintosh is PowerPoint 98 Viewer for the Classic Mac OS and Classic Environment, for Macs supporting System 7.5 to Mac OS X Tiger (10.4). It can open presentations only from PowerPoint 3.0, 4.0, and 8.0 (PowerPoint 98), although presentations created on Mac can be opened in PowerPoint Viewer on Windows.

As of May 2018, the last versions of PowerPoint Viewer for all platforms have been retired by Microsoft; they are no longer available for download and no longer receive security updates. The final PowerPoint Viewer for Windows (2010) and the final PowerPoint Viewer for Classic Mac OS (1998) are available only from archives. The recommended replacements for PowerPoint Viewer: "On Windows 10 PCs, download the free ... PowerPoint Mobile application from the Windows Store," and "On Windows 7 or Windows 8/8.1 PCs, upload the file to OneDrive and view it for free using ... PowerPoint Online."

== Versions ==
Unsupported
Supported
Latest version
Preview version

PowerPoint release history
Date	Name	Version	System	Comments
April 1987	PowerPoint	1.0	Macintosh	Shipped by Forethought, Inc.
October 1987	PowerPoint	1.01	Macintosh	Relabeled and shipped by Microsoft
May 1988	PowerPoint	2.0	Macintosh	
December 1988	PowerPoint	2.01	Macintosh	Added Genigraphics software and services
May 1990	PowerPoint	2.0	Windows	Announced with Windows 3.0, numbered to match contemporary Macintosh version
May 1992	PowerPoint	3.0	Windows	Announced with Windows 3.1
September 1992	PowerPoint	3.0	Macintosh	
February 1994	PowerPoint	4.0	Windows	
October 1994	PowerPoint	4.0	Macintosh	Native for Power Mac
July 1995	PowerPoint 95	7.0	Windows	Versions 5.0 and 6.0 were skipped on Windows, so all apps in Office 95 were 7.0
January 1997	PowerPoint 97	8.0	Windows	Support ended on February 28, 2002
March 1998	PowerPoint 98	8.0	Macintosh	Versions 5.0, 6.0, and 7.0 were skipped on Macintosh, to match Windows
June 1999	PowerPoint 2000	9.0	Windows	Support ended on July 14, 2009
August 2000	PowerPoint 2001	9.0	Macintosh	
May 2001	PowerPoint XP	10.0	Windows	Support ended on July 12, 2011
November 2001	PowerPoint v. X	10.0	Macintosh	
October 2003	PowerPoint 2003	11.0	Windows	Support ended on April 8, 2014
June 2004	PowerPoint 2004	11.0	Macintosh	
May 2005	PowerPoint Mobile	11.0	Windows Mobile 5	
January 2007	PowerPoint 2007	12.0	Windows	End of support October 10, 2017
September 2007	PowerPoint Mobile	12.0	Windows Mobile 6	
January 2008	PowerPoint 2008	12.0	Macintosh	
June 2010	PowerPoint 2010	14.0	Windows	Version 13.0 was skipped for triskaidekaphobia concerns. Support ended on October 13, 2020
June 2010	PowerPoint 2010 Web App	14.0	Web	
June 2010	PowerPoint Mobile 2010	14.0	Windows Phone 7	
November 2010	PowerPoint 2011	14.0	Macintosh	Version 13.0 was skipped for triskaidekaphobia concerns End of support October 10, 2017
April 2012	PowerPoint Mobile 2010	14.0	Nokia Symbian	
October 2012	PowerPoint Web App 2013	15.0	Web	
November 2012	PowerPoint Mobile 2013	15.0	Windows Phone 8	
November 2012	PowerPoint RT 2013	15.0	Windows RT	
January 2013	PowerPoint 2013	15.0	Windows	
June 2013	PowerPoint Mobile 2013 for iPhone	15.0	iPhone	
July 2013	PowerPoint Mobile 2013 for Android	15.0	Android	
February 2014	PowerPoint 2013 Online	15.0	Web	
March 2014	PowerPoint 2013 for iPad	15.0	iPad	
November 2014	PowerPoint Mobile 2013 for iOS	15.0	iOS	
June 2015	PowerPoint Mobile 2016 for Android	16.0	Android	
July 2015	PowerPoint 2016 for Macintosh	16.0	Macintosh	There had been no PowerPoint 2013 for Mac. Was version 15.0 from July 2015 to January 2018.
July 2015	PowerPoint Mobile 2016	16.0	Windows 10 Mobile	
July 2015	PowerPoint Mobile 2016 for iOS	16.0	iOS	
September 2015	PowerPoint 2016 for Windows	16.0	Windows	
January 2018	PowerPoint 2016 for Windows Store	16.0	Windows	
2018	PowerPoint 2019	16.0	Windows and other OS	This and subsequent versions (PowerPoint 2021 and Office 365 PowerPoint) are all internally version 16.0
Date	Name	Version	System	Comments

Icon for PowerPoint for Mac 2008

Microsoft PowerPoint for Mac 2011

PowerPoint 1.0
For Macintosh: April 1987
Innovations included: multiple slides in a single file, organizing slides with a slide sorter view and a title view (precursor of outline view), speakers' notes pages attached to each slide, printing of audience handouts with multiple slides per page, text with outlining styles and full word-processor formatting, graphic shapes with attached text for drawing diagrams and tables. It also shipped with a hardbound book as its manual.
"It produced overhead transparencies on a black-and-white Macintosh for laser printing. Presenters could now directly control their own overheads and would no longer have to work through the person with the typewriter. PowerPoint handled the task of making the overheads all look alike; one change reformats them all. Typographic fonts were better than an Orator typeball, and charts and diagrams could be imported from MacDraw, MacPaint, and Excel, thanks to the new Mac clipboard."
System requirements: (Mac) Original Macintosh or better, System 1.0 or higher, 512K RAM.

PowerPoint 2.0
For Macintosh: May 1988; for Windows: May 1990
Part of Microsoft Office for Mac and Microsoft Office for Windows. Innovations included: color, more word processing features, find and replace, spell checking, color schemes for presentations, guide to color selection, ability to change color scheme retrospectively, shaded coloring for fills.
"It added color 35 mm slides, transmitting the resulting file over a modem to Genigraphics for imaging on Genigraphics' film recorders and photo processing in Genigraphics' labs overnight. Genigraphics was the leading professional service bureau, having developed its own Digital Equipment Corp. PDP-11-based computer systems for its artists. After a short time, though, Genigraphics itself switched to PowerPoint."
System requirements: (Mac) Original Macintosh or better, System 4.1 or higher, 1 MB RAM. (Windows) 286 PC or higher, Windows 3.0, 1 MB RAM.

PowerPoint 3.0
For Windows, May 1992; for Mac: September 1992
Part of Microsoft Office for Windows 3.0 and Microsoft Office for Mac 3.0. Innovations included: the first application designed exclusively for the new Windows 3.1 platform, full support for TrueType fonts (new in Windows 3.1), presentation templates, editing in outline view, new drawing, including freeform tool, autoshapes, flip, rotate, scale, align, and transforming imported pictures into their drawing primitives to make them editable, transitions between slides in slide show, progressive builds, incorporating sound and video. Animations included "flying bullets" where bullet points "flew" into the slide one by one, and some degree of Pen Computing support was included.
"It added video-out to feed the new video projectors, with effects that could replace a bank of synchronized slide projectors. This version added fades, dissolves, and other transitions, as well as animation of text and pictures, and could incorporate video clips with synchronized audio."
System requirements: (Windows) 286 PC or higher, Windows 3.1, 2 MB RAM. (Mac) Macintosh Plus or better, System 7 or higher, 4 MB RAM.

PowerPoint 4.0
For Windows: February 1994; for Mac: October 1994
Part of Microsoft Office for Windows 4.0 and Microsoft Office for Mac 4.2. Innovations included: autolayouts, Word tables, rehearsal mode, hidden slides, and the "AutoContent Wizard".
Introduced a standard "Microsoft Office" look and feel (shared with Word and Excel), with status bar, toolbars, tooltips. Full OLE 2.0 with in-place activation.
System requirements: (Windows) 386 PC or higher, Windows 3.1, 8 MB RAM. (Mac) 68020 Mac or better, System 7 or higher, 8 MB RAM.

PowerPoint 7.0
For Windows: July 1995
Part of Microsoft Office for Windows 95. Innovations included: new animation effects, real curves and textures, black and white view, autocorrect, insert symbol, meeting support features such as "Meeting Minder".
"A complete rewrite of the product from the ground up in C++, full object model with internal VBA programmability".
System requirements: (Windows) 386 DX PC or higher, Windows 95, 6 MB RAM.

PowerPoint 8.0
For Windows: January 1997; for Mac: March 1998
Part of Microsoft Office for Windows 97 and Microsoft Office 98 Macintosh Edition. Innovations included: "Office Assistant", file compression, save to HTML, "Pack and Go", "AutoClipArt", transparent GIFs.
System requirements: (Windows) 486 PC or higher, 8 MB RAM. (Mac) PowerPC Mac or better, 16 MB RAM.

PowerPoint 9.0
For Windows: June 1999; for Mac: August 2000
Part of Microsoft Office for Windows 2000 and Microsoft Office for Mac 2001. Innovations included: three-pane "browser" view (selectable list of slide miniatures or titles, large single slide, notes), autofit text, real tables, presentation conferencing, save to web, picture bullets, animated GIFs, aliased fonts.
System requirements: (Windows) Pentium 75MHz+, Windows 95 or higher, 20 MB RAM. (Mac) PowerPC Mac 120MHz+ or better, MacOS 8.5 or higher, minimum 48 MB RAM.

PowerPoint 10.0
For Windows: May 2001; for Mac: November 2001
Part of Microsoft Office for Windows XP and Microsoft Office for Mac v.X. Innovations included: install from web, most clipart on web, use of Exchange and SharePoint for storage and collaboration.
System requirements: (Windows) Pentium III, Windows 98 or higher, 40 MB RAM. (Mac) OS X 10.1 ("Puma") or later (will not run under OS 9).

PowerPoint 11.0
For Windows: October 2003; for Mac: June 2004; for Mobile: May 2005
Part of Microsoft Office for Windows 2003 and Microsoft Office for Mac 2004. Innovations included: tools visible to presenter during slide show (notes, thumbnails, time clock, re-order and edit slides), "Package for CD" to write presentation and viewer app to CD. "Microsoft Producer for PowerPoint 2003" was a free plug-in from Microsoft, using a video camera, "that creates Web page presentations, with talking head narration, coordinated and timed to your existing PowerPoint presentation" for delivery over the web. The Genigraphics software to send a presentation for imaging as 35mm slides was removed from this version.
System requirements: (Windows) Pentium 233Mhz+, Windows 2000 with SP3 or later, 128 MB RAM. (Mac) Power Mac G3 or better, OS X 10.2.8 or later, 256 MB RAM.

PowerPoint 12.0
For Windows: January 2007; for Mobile: September 2007; for Mac: January 2008
Part of Microsoft Office for Windows 2007 and Microsoft Office for Mac 2008. Innovations included: new user interface ("Office Fluent") employing a changeable "ribbon" of tools across the top to replace menus and toolbars, SmartArt graphics, many graphical improvements in text and drawing, improved "Presenter View" (from 2003), widescreen slide formats. The "AutoContent Wizard" was removed from this version.
A major change in PowerPoint 2007 was from a binary file format, used from 1997 to 2003, to a new XML file format which evolved over further versions.
System requirements: (Windows) 500 MHz processor or higher, Windows XP with SP2 or later, 256 MB RAM. (Mac) 500 MHz processor or higher, MacOS X 10.4.9 or later, 512 MB RAM.

PowerPoint 14.0
For Windows: June 2010; for Web: June 2010; for Mobile: June 2010; for Mac: November 2010, for Symbian: April 2012
Part of Microsoft Office for Windows 2010 and Microsoft Office for Mac 2011. Innovations included: Single document interface (SDI), sections within presentations, reading view, redesign of "Backstage" functions (under File menu), save as video, insert video from web, embed video and audio, enhanced editing for video and for pictures, broadcast slideshow.
System requirements: (Windows) 500 MHz processor or higher, Windows XP with SP3 or later, 256 MB RAM, 512 MB RAM recommended for video. (Mac) Intel processor, Mac OS X 10.5.8 or later, 1 GB RAM.

PowerPoint 15.0
For Web: October 2012; for Mobile: November 2012; for Windows RT: November 2012; for Windows: January 2013; for iPhone: June 2013; for Android: July 2013; for Web: February 2014; for iPad: March 2014; for iOS: November 2014; for Mac: July 2015
Part of Microsoft Office for Windows 2013 and Microsoft Office for Mac 2016. Innovations included: Change default slide shape to 16:9 aspect ratio, online collaboration by multiple authors, user interface redesigned for multi-touch screens, improved audio, video, animations, and transitions, further changes to Presenter View. Clipart collections (and insertion tool) were removed, but available online.
System requirements: (Windows) 1 GHz processor or faster, x86- or x64-bit processor with SSE2 instruction set, Windows 7 or later, 1 GB RAM (32-bit), 2 GB RAM (64-bit). (Mac) Intel processor, Mac OS X 10.10 or later, 4 GB RAM.

PowerPoint 16.0
For Android: June 2015; for Mobile: July 2015; for iOS: July 2015; for Windows: September 2015; and Windows Store: January 2018
Part of Microsoft Office for Windows 2016. Innovations included: "Tell me" to search for program controls, "PowerPoint Designer" pane, Morph transition, real-time collaboration, "Zoom" to slides or sections in slideshow, and "Presentation Translator" for real-time translation of a presenter's spoken words to on-screen captions in any of 60+ languages, with the system analyzing the text of the PowerPoint presentation as context to increase the accuracy and relevance of the translations.
System requirements: (Windows) 1 GHz processor or faster, x86- or x64-bit processor with SSE2 instruction set, Windows 7 with SP 1 or later, 2 GB RAM.

== File formats ==
PowerPoint Presentation
- Filename extensions: .pptx, .ppt
- Internet media type: application/vnd.openxmlformats-officedocument.presentationml.presentation, application/vnd.ms-powerpoint
- Uniform Type Identifier (UTI): com.microsoft.powerpoint.ppt
- Developed by: Microsoft
- Type of format: Presentation

=== Binary (1987–2007) ===
Early versions of PowerPoint, from 1987 through 1995 (versions 1.0 through 7.0), evolved through a sequence of binary file formats, different in each version, as functionality was added. This set of formats were never documented, but an open-source libmwaw (used by LibreOffice) exists to read them.

A stable binary format (called a .ppt file, like all earlier binary formats) that was shared as the default in PowerPoint 97 through PowerPoint 2003 for Windows, and in PowerPoint 98 through PowerPoint 2004 for Mac (that is, in PowerPoint versions 8.0 through 11.0) was finally created. It was based on the Compound File Binary Format. The specification document is actively maintained and can be freely downloaded, because, although no longer the default, that binary format can be read and written by some later versions of PowerPoint, including PowerPoint 2016. After the stable binary format was adopted, versions of PowerPoint continued to be able to read and write differing file formats from earlier versions. But beginning with PowerPoint 2007 and PowerPoint 2008 for Mac (PowerPoint version 12.0), this was the only binary format available for saving; PowerPoint 2007 (version 12.0) no longer supported saving to binary file formats used earlier than PowerPoint 97 (version 8.0), ten years before.

The ".pps" and ".ppsx" file extensions are technically the same as ".ppt" and ".pptx", except they are launched as presentation instead of for editing by default.

Binary filename extensions

- .ppt, PowerPoint 97–2003 binary presentation
- .pps, PowerPoint 97–2003 binary slide show
- .pot, PowerPoint 97–2003 binary template

Binary media types

- .ppt, application/vnd.ms-powerpoint
- .pps, application/vnd.ms-powerpoint
- .pot, application/vnd.ms-powerpoint

=== Office Open XML (since 2007) ===
The big change in PowerPoint 2007 and PowerPoint 2008 for Mac (PowerPoint version 12.0) was that the stable binary file format of 97–2003 was replaced as the default by a new zipped XML-based Office Open XML format (.pptx files). Microsoft's explanation of the benefits of the change included: smaller file sizes, up to 75% smaller than comparable binary documents; security, through being able to identify and exclude executable macros and personal data; less chance to be corrupted than binary formats; and easier interoperability for exchanging data among Microsoft and other business applications, all while maintaining backward compatibility.

XML filename extensions

- .pptx, PowerPoint 2007 XML presentation
- .pptm, PowerPoint 2007 XML macro-enabled presentation
- .ppsx, PowerPoint 2007 XML slide show
- .ppsm, PowerPoint 2007 XML macro-enabled slide show
- .ppam, PowerPoint 2007 XML add-in
- .potx, PowerPoint 2007 XML template
- .potm, PowerPoint 2007 XML macro-enabled template

XML media types

- .pptx, application/vnd.openxmlformats-officedocument.presentationml.presentation
- .pptm, application/vnd.ms-powerpoint.presentation.macroEnabled.12
- .ppsx, application/vnd.openxmlformats-officedocument.presentationml.slideshow
- .ppsm, application/vnd.ms-powerpoint.slideshow.macroEnabled.12
- .ppam, application/vnd.ms-powerpoint.addin.macroEnabled.12
- .potx, application/vnd.openxmlformats-officedocument.presentationml.template
- .potm, application/vnd.ms-powerpoint.template.macroEnabled.12

The specification for the new format was published as an open standard, ECMA-376, through Ecma International Technical Committee 45 (TC45). The Ecma 376 standard was approved in December 2006, and was submitted for standardization through ISO/IEC JTC 1/SC 34 WG4 in early 2007. The standardization process was contentious. It was approved as ISO/IEC 29500 in early 2008. Copies of the ISO/IEC standard specification are freely available, in two parts. These define two related standards known as "Transitional" and "Strict". The two standards were progressively adopted by PowerPoint: PowerPoint version 12.0 (2007, 2008 for Mac) could read and write Transitional format, but could neither read nor write Strict format. PowerPoint version 14.0 (2010, 2011 for Mac) could read and write Transitional, and also read but not write Strict. PowerPoint version 15.0 and later (beginning 2013, 2016 for Mac) can read and write both Transitional and Strict formats. The reason for the two variants was explained by Microsoft:

... the participants in the ISO/IEC standardization process recognized two objectives with competing requirements. The first objective was for the Open XML standard to provide an XML-based file format that could fully support conversion of the billions of existing Office documents without any loss of features, content, text, layout, or other information, including embedded data. The second was to specify a file format that did not rely on Microsoft-specific data types. They created two variants of Open XML—Transitional, which supports previously-defined Microsoft-specific data types, and Strict, which does not rely on them. Prior versions of Office [that is, 2007] have supported reading and writing Transitional Open XML, and Office 2010 can read Strict Open XML documents. With the addition of write support for Strict Open XML, Office 2013 provides full support for both variants of Open XML.

The PowerPoint .pptx file format (called "PresentationML" for Presentation Markup Language) contains separate structures for all the complex parts of a PowerPoint presentation. The specification documents run to over six thousand pages. Because of the widespread use of PowerPoint, the standardized file formats are considered important for the long-term access to digital documents in library collections and archives, according to the U.S. Library of Congress.

PowerPoint 2013 and PowerPoint 2016 provide options to set default saving to ISO/IEC 29500 Strict format, but the initial default setting remains Transitional, for compatibility with legacy features incorporating binary data in existing documents. PowerPoint 2013 or PowerPoint 2016 will both open and save files in the former binary format (.ppt), for compatibility with older versions of the program (but not versions older than PowerPoint 97). In saving to older formats, these versions of PowerPoint will check to assure that no features have been introduced into the presentation which are incompatible with the older formats.

PowerPoint 2013 and 2016 will also save a presentation in many other file formats, including PDF format, MPEG-4 or WMV video, as a sequence of single-picture files (using image formats including GIF, JPEG, PNG, TIFF, and some older formats), and as a single presentation file in which all slides are replaced with pictures. PowerPoint will both open and save files in OpenDocument Presentation format (ODP) for compatibility.

== Logo gallery ==
2025–present

2019–2025

2013–2019

2000–2003

== See also ==
- Microsoft Office password protection
- PowerPoint karaoke
- Web-based slideshow
