= Genigraphics =

Computer graphics system and printing service bureau

Genigraphics is a large-format printing service bureau specializing in providing poster session services to medical and scientific conferences throughout the US and Canada. The company began in 1973 as a division of General Electric.

== History ==
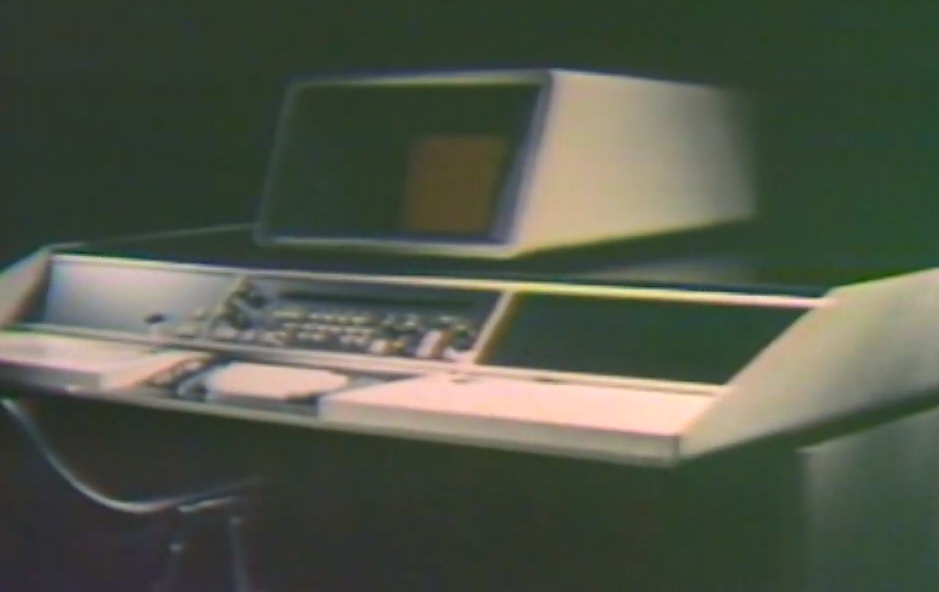
The console of the original Genigraphics 100 system, circa 1973.

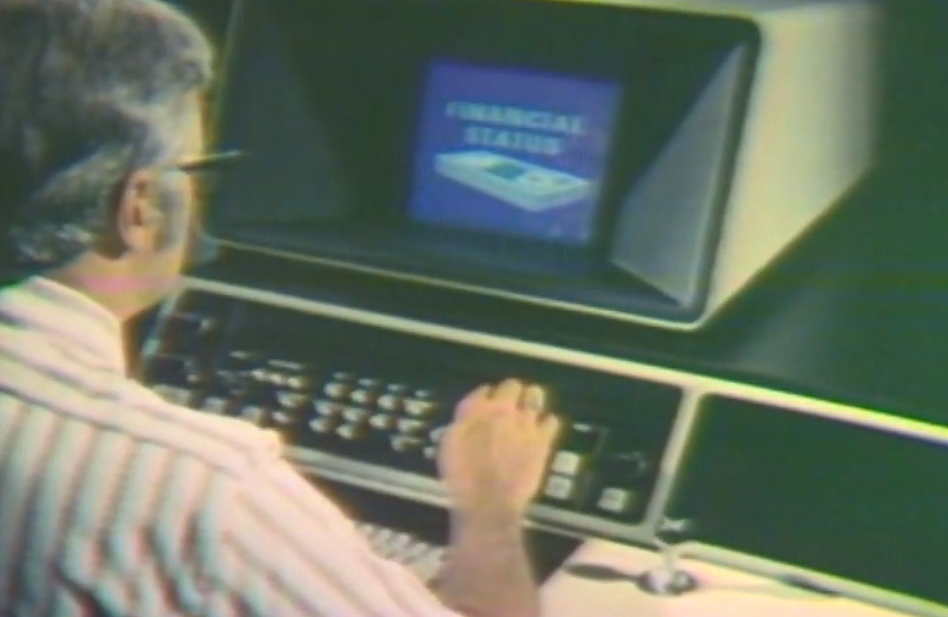
An artist sits at the console of a Genigraphics 100 system.

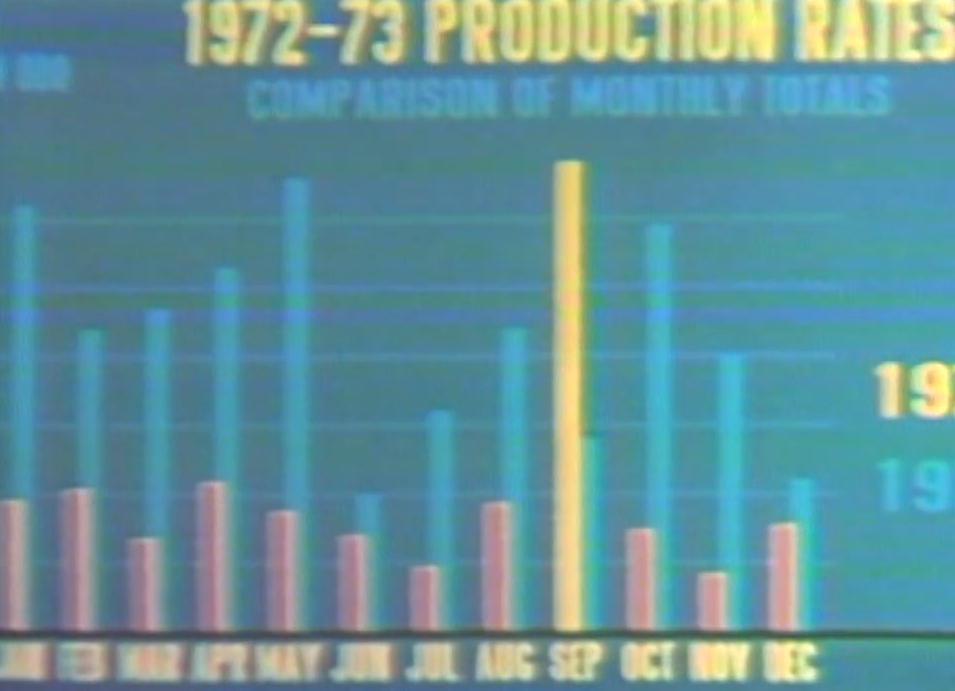
A sample slide produced by a Genigraphics 100 system around 1973.

Genigraphics began as a computer graphics system, developed by General Electric in the late 1960s, for NASA to use in space flight simulation. The technologies thus developed provided a foundation for the company's expansion into the commercial market. The Computed Images System & Services division (CISS, to become Genigraphics Corporation) of GE delivered the first presentation graphics system to Amoco Oil's corporate headquarters in 1973. It was named the 100 Series, and was based on DEC's PDP 11 series of mini computer systems. The first Genigraphics systems (100 Series and 100A Series) used an array of buttons, dials, knobs and joysticks, along with a built in keyboard, as the means of user interface. The PDP-11/40 computer was housed in a tall cabinet and used random access magnetic tape drives (DECtape) for storing completed presentations.

The graphics generator (Forox recorder) was capable of outputting 2,000 line resolution, suitable for 35mm and 72mm film and large sheet film positive using larger cassettes for recording. 4000 and 8000 line resolution was later achieved with duplex scanning and 4x scanning by modifying to the Forox recorder's settings menu. Subsequent models (100B, C, D, D+ and D+/GVP) replaced the knobs and dials with an on screen, text based menu system, a graphics tablet and a pen. The pen/tablet combination gave way to a mouse like device in later models, and served to provide the interface with the graphics tools. User interaction with the computer for functions such as media initialization or modem to modem data transfer required a DECwriter serial terminal. In 1982, GE divested the Genigraphics division along with a host of other "non essential" business units (Genitext, Geniponics) and Genigraphics Corporation was born. Shortly after the divestiture, the headquarters of Genigraphics was moved from Liverpool, New York to Saddle Brook, New Jersey. Major success followed as the company grew exponentially over the next few years selling both systems and slide creation services.

Genigraphics film recorders produced high-resolution digital images on 35mm film. The computer-generated scenes for The Last Starfighter were calculated on a Cray X-MP supercomputer and mastered with a Genigraphics film recorder.

At its peak, Genigraphics Corporation employed roughly 300 people in 24 offices worldwide, with revenues upwards of $70 million annually.

By the late 1980s Genigraphics saw demand for its proprietary systems dwindle and began selling the MASTERPIECE 8770 film recorder and GRAFTIME software as a peripheral for DEC Vaxes, IBM PC AT’s, and Mac NuBus machines. But the MASTERPIECE film recorder proved too expensive to sell in volume.

In 1988, the company began a partnership with Microsoft to help develop the PowerPoint software. In exchange, every copy of PowerPoint included a “Send to Genigraphics” link to have files sent to a Genigraphics service bureau to be produced as 35mm slides. This partnership continued until 2001.

In 1989, after three years of flat revenue, Genigraphics sold its hardware business in order to focus on its service bureau business and partnership with Microsoft via PowerPoint.

In 1994, all assets of Genigraphics, including equipment, software development, in-house artwork, trademarks, and rights to the Microsoft partnership, were sold to InFocus Corporation of Wilsonville, Oregon who continued to operate under the Genigraphics brand name. The twenty-four service bureaus were consolidated to a 20,000 square foot facility next to the FedEx hub in Memphis, Tennessee. This allowed PowerPoint slide orders to be received until 10pm and delivered across the United States by the following morning.

In 1995, InFocus registered www.genigraphics.com and was among the first to offer a form of ecommerce allowing 35mm slides, color prints and transparencies, printed booklets, and digital projectors to be purchased online.

In 1998, then current management bought Genigraphics from InFocus and have operated it continuously ever since as Genigraphics LLC. That same year, InFocus projector rentals were added to the “Send to Genigraphics” link in PowerPoint and Genigraphics became the rental and repair center for all InFocus national accounts. It also marked Genigraphics entry into the new industry of large format printing; leveraging their knowledge of, and access to, PowerPoint programming code to develop a proprietary printer driver to output directly to an Epson 9500 wide format printer. At the time, Genigraphics was the exclusive 35mm slide vendor for all Kinko’s stores in the United States and poster printing was added to the arrangement.

In 2003, Genigraphics closed their 35mm slide E6 photo lab – one of the last high-volume commercial E6 labs in the US – and expanded their large format printing capabilities.

Since 2003, Genigraphics has become a major player in the poster session market, providing printing and on-site services to medical and scientific conferences throughout the US and Canada. As of February 2019, over 150,000 medical or scientific ‘ePosters’ are made available through their ResearchPosters.com archive service.

=== Partnership with Microsoft and development of PowerPoint ===
As presentations began to be created on personal computers in the late 80’s, Genigraphics sought presentation software partners in Silicon Valley who would be interested in sending files to Genigraphics via dial-up modem to be produced on 35mm slides. In 1987, Michael Beetner, Director of Marketing Planning for Genigraphics, met with Robert Gaskins, head of Microsoft's Graphics Business Unit, who was leading the development of the newly released PowerPoint software. A joint development agreement between Microsoft and Genigraphics was agreed upon and announced at Mac World 1988.

According to Erica Robles-Anderson and Patrik Svensson, "It would be hard to overestimate Genigraphics’ influence on PowerPoint. PowerPoint 2.0 was designed for Genigraphics film recorders. It shipped with Genigraphics color palettes, schemes, and the distinctively Genigraphics color-gradient backgrounds. The application contained a ‘Send to Genigraphics’ menu item that wrote the presentation to floppy disk or transmitted the order directly via modem. Within three and a half months PowerPoint orders accounted for ten percent of revenue at Genigraphics service centers.

PowerPoint 3.0 was even more intimately dependent upon Genigraphics. The software incorporated a collection of clip art images and symbols that had been produced by hundreds of artists at dozens of service centers across tens of thousands of presentations. Genigraphics artists designed PowerPoint 3.0 colors, templates, and sample presentations. The software even used Genigraphics (rather than Excel) chart style. Bar charts were rendered two-dimensionally with apparent thickness added to make them seemingly recede from the axes. The technique made it easier for viewers to compare bar heights and estimate values from axis ticks and labels. Pie charts were handled analogously. Microsoft paid Genigraphics to produce more than 500 clip art drawings and symbols used in Microsoft programs.”

In exchange for Genigraphics development efforts, Microsoft included a “Send to Genigraphics” link in every copy of PowerPoint through the 10.0 version (2000/2001). The arrangement came to an end when Microsoft restructured as a result of anti-trust lawsuits.
