= Medzany =

Village and municipality in Slovakia

- Municipality
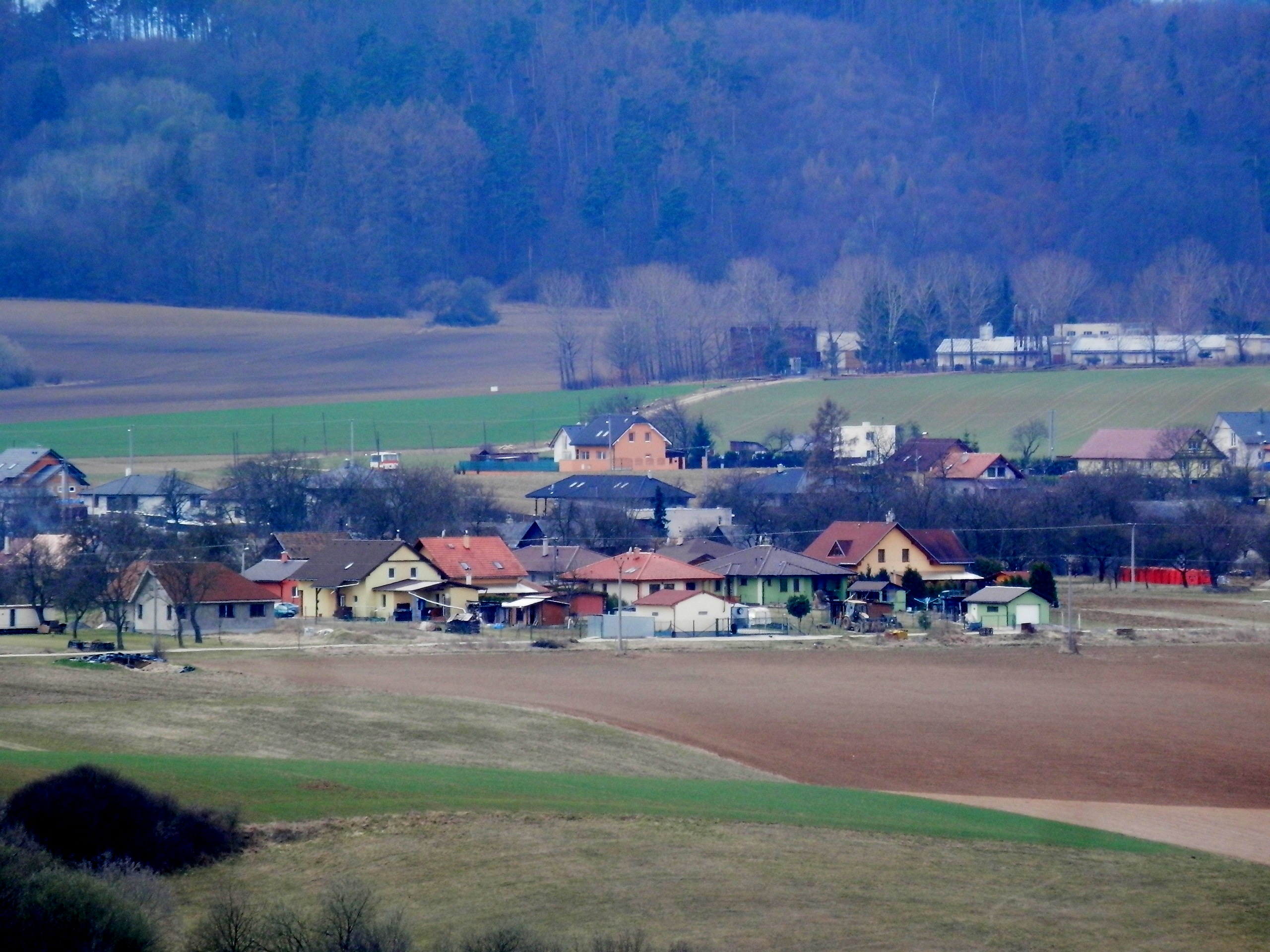

- Location of Medzany in the Prešov Region Location of Medzany in Slovakia
- Coordinates: 49.05°N 21.15°E
- Country: Slovakia
- Region: Prešov Region
- District: Prešov District
- First mentioned: 1248

Area
  - Total: 7.07 km^{2} (2.73 sq mi)
- Elevation: 320 m (1,050 ft)

Population (2025)
  - Total: 1,125
- Time zone: UTC+1 (CET)
  - Summer (DST): UTC+2 (CEST)
- Postal code: 822 1
- Area code: +421 51
- Vehicle registration plate (until 2022): PO
- Website: obecmedzany.sk

Medzany is a village and municipality in Prešov District in the Prešov Region of eastern Slovakia. It has a 14th-century Catholic Church All Saints Church, Medzany

== History ==
In historical records the village was first mentioned in 1248.

== Geography ==
The municipality lies at an altitude of 320 metres (1,050 ft) and covers an area of 7.07 km^{2} (2.73 sq mi) (2025).

== Population ==
Population statistic (10 years)
| Year | 1995 | 2005 | 2015 | 2025 |
|---|---|---|---|---|
| Count | 516 | 630 | 852 | 1125 |
| Difference | | +22.09% | +35.23% | +32.04% |

Population statistic
| Year | 2024 | 2025 |
|---|---|---|
| Count | 1095 | 1125 |
| Difference | | +2.73% |

It has a population of 1125 people (31 December 2025).

=== Ethnicity ===
Census 2021 (1+ %)
| Ethnicity | Number | Fraction |
|---|---|---|
| Slovak | 963 | 98.46% |
| Not found out | 16 | 1.63% |
| Romani | 11 | 1.12% |
| Rusyn | 10 | 1.02% |
| Total | 978 | |

In year 2021 was 978 people by ethnicity 963 as Slovak, 16 as Not found out, 11 as Romani, 10 as Rusyn, 5 as Czech, 3 as Other, 2 as French, 1 as Polish and 1 as Bulgarian.

Note on population: The difference values of population numbers in the table "Population statistic" and in the sections "Ethnicity" & "Religion" is caused by the use of various statistical methods.

=== Religion ===
Census 2021 (1+ %)
| Religion | Number | Fraction |
|---|---|---|
| Roman Catholic Church | 647 | 66.16% |
| Evangelical Church | 135 | 13.8% |
| None | 80 | 8.18% |
| Greek Catholic Church | 30 | 3.07% |
| Church of the Brethren | 30 | 3.07% |
| Not found out | 16 | 1.64% |
| Eastern Orthodox Church | 11 | 1.12% |
| Total | 978 | |

In year 2021 was 978 people by religion 647 from Roman Catholic Church, 135 from Evangelical Church, 80 from None, 30 from Greek Catholic Church, 30 from Church of the Brethren, 16 from Not found out, 11 from Eastern Orthodox Church, 8 from Other and not ascertained christian church, 6 from Baptists Church, 5 from Christian Congregations in Slovakia, 2 from Other, 2 from United Methodist Church, 2 from Apostolic Church, 2 from Ad hoc movements, 1 from Calvinist Church and 1 from New Apostolic Church.
