= TrueSpace =

Computer graphics software

- Developer: Caligari Corporation
- Stable release: 7.61 / May 25, 2009
- Operating system: Microsoft Windows
- Type: 3D computer graphics
- License: Proprietary (Freeware)
- Website: caligari.com at the Wayback Machine (archived January 15, 2012)

TrueSpace (styled as trueSpace) was a commercial 3D computer graphics and animation software developed by Caligari Corporation, bought-out by Microsoft. As of May 2009, it was officially discontinued, but with some 'unofficial support' up to February 2010.

== History ==
The company was founded in 1985 by Roman Ormandy. A prototype 3D video animation package for the Amiga Computer led to the incorporation of Octree Software in 1986. From 1988 to 1992, Octree released several software packages including Caligari1, Caligari2, Caligari Broadcast, and Caligari 24. Caligari wanted to provide inexpensive yet professional, industrial video and corporate presentation software. In 1993 Octree Software moved from New York to California and became known as Caligari Corporation.

In 1994 trueSpace 1.0 was introduced on the Windows platform. In 1998 an employee inadvertently left a copy of the trueSpace 4.0 sourcecode on the company website's public FTP server. The source code was released to the internet by the piracy release group REVOLT. In early 2008, the company was acquired by Microsoft and trueSpace 7.6 was released for free.

== End of Life ==
As of May 19, 2009, Ormandy announced that TrueSpace had been discontinued:

Dear Caligari customer,

You may have heard that Microsoft Corporation, reacting to difficult business conditions, has been evaluating many of the products it produces and making the difficult decision to reduce investment in certain areas.

It is with regret that I have to tell you that trueSpace is one of the products affected. As a consequence, you will see reduction or elimination of services offered for trueSpace. For example, there will be no phone or email support offered for trueSpace by Microsoft, and our web site may also be affected. While the dates are not absolutely fixed, some services and contacts may come to an end as early as Friday May 22, 2009, while others will continue as long as possible with no firm cutoff date available yet.

— Roman Ormandy

Elsewhere he thanks everyone, urges people to download all the free software as soon as possible. It may currently (as of 2023) be downloaded from a fan site along with various plugins.

After 2010, many of the developers helped develop Microsoft's 3D Builder application available for free in the Windows Store. There are many similarities between 3D Builder and the original TrueSpace product.

== Overview ==
TrueSpace was a modeling/animation/rendering package. It featured a plug-in architecture that allowed the user to create tools to enhance the core package. TrueSpace was at the last release version 7 (also known to its users as tS7). Point upgrades had brought it up to version Rosetta Beta 7.61 and had added new modeling features. It also had an interface that beginners found easy to learn.

Caligari had enhanced the modeling, surfacing and rendering capabilities of TrueSpace, and the latest version TrueSpace7 allowed all aspects of real-time design, modeling and animation within a virtual 3D space shared by remote participants over the broadband internet. The TrueSpace7 collaboration server enables multiple participants to connect to a shared 3D space to create and manipulate shared content in real-time.

== Features ==
One of the most distinctive features of trueSpace is its interface, using mainly 3D widgets for most common editing operations. trueSpace can also be scripted, using Python for creating custom scripts, tools and plugins. trueSpace7 introduces the use of VBScript and JScript as scripting tools for developing plugins and interactive scenes. trueSpace is also known for its icon-heavy interface which was drastically overhauled for version 7 onwards. While staff at Caligari had originally made them 'inhouse' during the creation process of earlier releases, trueSpace 7 had a new set of icons made by Paul Woodward, a freelance designer and illustrator.

Capabilities of the software include creating visualizations and animations with realistic lighting (through the use of radiosity, HDRI and global illumination) and organic modelling using NURBS, subdivision surfaces and metaballs.

The software has several native formats: RsScn for scenes, RsObj for objects, RSMat for materials, rsl for layouts, RsLgts for lighting, etc. Older formats native to trueSpace6.6 and earlier are also supported, e.g. one for standalone objects (with the file extension .cob), and another for the scenes (with the file extension .scn). Objects in trueSpace can be embedded in Active Worlds. In addition to its native formats, trueSpace can also import and export several additional model types.

== Modeling ==
- Polygon modeling
- NURBS
- Subdivision surface

== Rendering and surfacing ==
Currently TrueSpace has two native internal rendering engines and also support for DX9 pixel shader output quality images alongside the traditional style Render engines. These engines are:

- LightWorks (from Lightwork Design Ltd.)
- VirtuaLight

TrueSpace7 also includes support for the VRay rendering engine.

=== Rendering ===
- HDRI
- Caustics
- Multi-pass Rendering for the Lightworks rendering engine with output to Photoshop layers integrated into TrueSpace7
- Hybrid radiosity, ray tracing, Phong shading
- Image-based lighting
- Non-linear tone mapping editor
- Post process editor
- Advanced shaders (color, reflectance, transparency, displacement, background, foreground, post processing)
- Volumetric, anisotropic reflectance

=== Surfacing ===
- DX9 (SL2.0) pixel shaders and HLSL editing
- Procedural shaders editable in Link Editor
- Normal mapping
- Shader trees
- Modeless UV Editor
- Advanced UV Editor with real time UV mapping controls
- Unwrapper with Slice
- Breaking and welding of vertices in a UV map

== See also ==
- Lightwave 3D
- Cinema 4D
- Autodesk 3ds Max
- Modo
- Blender
- Aladdin4D
- Bryce
