= Forethought, Inc. =

Computer software company

- Type: Private
- Industry: Software
- Founded: 1983; 43 years ago
- Founders: Rob Campbell; Taylor Pohlman
- Defunct: 1987
- Fate: Acquired by Microsoft in 1987

Forethought, Inc. was a computer software company, best known as the original developers of what is now Microsoft PowerPoint.

The company was acquired by Microsoft in 1987.

== History ==
In early 1983, Rob Campbell and Taylor Pohlman, former Apple Computer executives, founded Forethought, Inc. in order to develop object-oriented bit-mapped application software, which they called Foundation. Early investors included the two founders along with venture capital firms New Enterprise Associates and Lameroux & Glenn Partners. In 1984, the company was struggling in the development of Foundation, and it was decided to switch to a Macintosh publishing strategy, since that was the only computer shipping in volume that had a graphical user interface. The company published several software products in 1984 under their MacWare brand, including Factfinder.

That same year, they were introduced by Apple to a small company, Nashoba Systems, that had developed the Nutshell database for the PC. A contract was signed for Forethought to publish a Macintosh version, which shipped in 1985 as FileMaker and it soon became enormously successful. Also in 1984, Forethought hired Robert Gaskins, who proposed the development of a specialized product to create presentations, code-named Presenter. Gaskins, along with Dennis Austin, led the development of Presenter. Shortly before shipment in 1987, a name conflict was discovered, so the company renamed the product PowerPoint.

When PowerPoint 1.0 was released in 1987 for the Macintosh, the initial version was published using the Forethought brand. Approximately 10,000 copies of that version were initially produced and sold. It ran in black and white, generating text-and-graphics pages for overhead transparencies. Shortly after the first shipment of the Forethought version, Forethought was purchased by Microsoft for $14 million (~$34 million in 2025). The product was then rebranded as a Microsoft product, still named PowerPoint, and was shipped later that year by Microsoft. Robert Gaskins and the PowerPoint development team joined Microsoft, and continued to develop PowerPoint. A full-color version of PowerPoint shipped a year later after the release of the color Macintosh II. In May 1990, the first versions for Windows 3.0 were produced. Since 1990, PowerPoint has been a standard part of the Microsoft Office suite of applications except for the Basic Edition. Microsoft PowerPoint would go on to become the most used and sought after presentation suite, having a 95% market share.

Because the contract with Nashoba Systems gave them the rights to the FileMaker product in case Forethought was acquired, Filemaker was returned to Nashoba, and they subsequently released an updated version under their own brand, but retained the FileMaker name, which at that point was selling at a run-rate of $6 million per year. After several versions, the product was acquired by Claris and is still one of the leading databases on both the Macintosh and Windows platforms.
