= PhoneFactor =

PhoneFactor is a proprietary multi-factor authentication owned by Microsoft. It uses telephone calls, SMS messages, and push notifications to verify identity.

PhoneFactor was originally developed by Positive Networks Inc., founded in 2001 by Tim Sutton and Steve Dispensa. The PhoneFactor product was launched in 2007, and the company changed their name to PhoneFactor Inc. in 2009. On October 4, 2012, Microsoft acquired PhoneFactor, and the PhoneFactor service is now available as Azure Multi-Factor Authentication. In addition to securing on-premises applications and identities, the service now also works with cloud applications like Microsoft 365 that use Windows Microsoft Azure Active Directory.
