= Pando Networks =

Media distribution company in New York

- Type: Private
- Industry: Peer Assisted Media Distribution
- Founded: 2004
- Headquarters: New York, New York, United States
- Key people: Robert Levitan (CEO and co-founder); Yaron Samid (CMO, Co-Founder); Avi Cohen (COO); Laird Popkin (CTO and co-founder)
- Products: Pando consumer application
- Services: Peer-assisted media distribution for game, software and video publishers
- Parent: Microsoft Corporation
- Website: pandonetworks.com

Founded in 2004 in New York City, Pando Networks was a managed peer-to-peer (P2P) media distribution company backed by Intel Capital, BRM Capital and Wheatley Partners. The company specialized in cloud distribution of games, video and software for publishers and media distributors and also operated a freemium consumer business for sending large files.

Pando Network's technology was based on BitTorrent but with modifications. Its hybrid P2P- and server-based network included central control over file distribution, intelligent throttling between peers and servers, reporting/analytics and security.

In the spring of 2006, the company publicly launched Pando, a small application that let consumers bypass email's attachment limits and send large files (up to 1GB) regardless of email service provider. By late May 2009, over 30 million people had installed the Pando application.

In late 2007, along with Verizon Communications, Pando Networks co-founded the P4P (“Proactive network Provider Participation for P2P”) Working Group, to serve both P2P companies and Internet service providers (ISPs), who were seeing as much of 70 percent of bandwidth go to P2P traffic. The P4P working group includes a mix of more than 50 P2P companies and ISPs including Telefónica and Comcast. A Yale computer science research team developed the P4P technical protocol, which they believed could speed P2P content delivery while lowering ISP network utilization. In collaboration with Yale and the P4P working group, Pando Networks adopted the technology and Laird Popkin coordinated a test in the summer of 2008, showing promising results.

The company released its first commercial service in May 2008; media distributors could now plug Pando Networks' peer cloud into their existing content delivery networks (CDNs). The combination of a peer cloud plus a CDN allows files in high demand to be quickly and cost effectively delivered by the peers and long tail content to be reliably served off the CDN.

NBC Universal incorporated Pando Networks’ technology later that year to deliver high-definition TV episodes to consumers’ PCs.

The game industry was Pando Networks’ largest customer segment. Installation files, particularly for massively multiplayer online games (MMOs), can reach well over 1GB. Pando Networks' game customers included Nexon, Turbine, Riot Games, Gala-Net, and LevelUp. In May 2010, Pando Networks surpassed 30 million game downloads.

Pando Networks was acquired by Microsoft in March 2013.

== See also ==
- Pando (application)
