= Razorfish (company) =

American interactive agency

- Type: Subsidiary
- Traded as: Nasdaq: RAZF (1999-2003)
- Industry: Digital marketing
- Predecessor: Razorfish Inc.; SBI Razorfish; Avenue A | Razorfish
- Founded: 1995; New York City, United States
- Founders: Craig Kanarick; Jeff Dachis
- Area served: Worldwide
- Key people: Dani Mariano (CEO)
- Parent: Publicis Groupe

Razorfish is a digital advertising agency and a subsidiary of Publicis Groupe. The brand was merged into Publicis in 2019 and was revived in 2020.

== History ==
=== Early history ===
Razorfish was started in 1995 in New York by Craig Kanarick and Jeff Dachis, who worked out of Dachis’s apartment in Manhattan's Alphabet City neighborhood. Their first large project was building a small website for the New York Botanical Garden for $20,000.

Kanarick created a website with animated gifs and the "server-push" feature of the Netscape browser, which he named "The Blue Dot". This site was a gallery of digital art that Kanarick and Dachis used to promote themselves to large companies.

In 1995, Razorfish made over $300,000, and in 1996, they earned over $1.2 million with a $300,000 profit. In 1997, Razorfish made over $3.6 million and began acquiring other companies. In 1998, Razorfish bought Avalanche Systems, Plastic in San Francisco, CHBi in London, <tag> media in Los Angeles, and merged with the Scandinavian company Spray.

In 1998, Razorfish made over $83 million and was profitable, with over 1,100 employees. In April 1999, they held an initial public offering (IPO), raising $48 million at $16 per share. In fall 1999, Razorfish bought International Integration, Inc. (I-Cube), which was their largest acquisition at the time. Sales for 1999 reached over $170 million.

In February 2000, Craig Kanarick and Jeff Dachis were interviewed on 60 Minutes II by Bob Simon, and struggled to clearly explain what their company did. The interview was widely seen as a failure.

In May 2000, Razorfish started Intervision-Razorfish, a joint venture in Tokyo. Around this time, the dot-com bubble began affecting the industry, and Razorfish's revenue decreased to $50 million in 2000 and 2001.

=== Acquisitions by SBI, aQuantive, and Microsoft ===
In 2003, SBI Group bought Razorfish and renamed it SBI.Razorfish. In 2004, aQuantive bought SBI.Razorfish and renamed it Avenue A | Razorfish. In 2005, this company had the highest interactive revenue in the U.S., at $189.8 million, according to Ad Age.

Between 2005 and 2007, Razorfish expanded overseas through acquisitions in London, Paris, Sydney, Hong Kong, Shanghai, Beijing, Berlin, Frankfurt, Singapore and a joint venture in Tokyo.

In 2007, Microsoft bought Avenue A | Razorfish as part of a $6.0 billion purchase of aQuantive. Microsoft sold Razorfish in 2009, as it competed with Microsoft Advertising's main business of selling ad technology to rival agencies.

=== Acquisition by Publicis Groupe ===
On August 9, 2009, Publicis Groupe bought Razorfish from Microsoft for $530 million in cash and shares, giving Microsoft a 3% stake in Publicis Groupe. In 2013, Razorfish launched its operations in India through the acquisition of Neev Technologies, which is based in Bengaluru.

In October 2016, Razorfish merged with Sapient Corporation's division SapientNitro, to form SapientRazorfish. In July 2018, Publicis began laid off 100 employees at Sapient Razorfish. On February 13, 2019, Publicis announced that Publicis.Sapient, SapientRazorfish, and Sapient Consulting had been merged into one brand, Publicis Sapient.

In January 2020, Publicis announced that it would revive the Razorfish brand for its digital marketing agency, consisting of clients that did not fit into Publicis Sapient's marketing strategy.
