= Atlas Solutions =

Advertising service

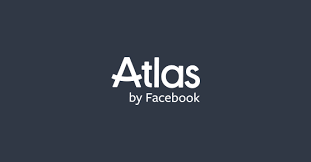
- Industry: Online advertising
- Parent: Meta Platforms
- Website: atlassolutions.com

Atlas Solutions was a subsidiary of Meta Platforms, acquired from Microsoft in February 2013, which provided services in online advertising. The Atlas advertising platform, originally built by Razorfish, served billions of ad impressions a day and featured a suite of tools for marketers to serve, manage, track, and measure the performance of advertisement campaigns.

Atlas was shut down in March 2018.

== See also ==
- DART (DoubleClick)
- AppNexus
