= Robert Gaskins =

PowerPoint creator and developer between 1985 and 1996

- Born: 1943
- Education: Los Angeles City College; University of Southern California (BA); University of California, Berkeley (MA)
- Occupation: Software developer
- Employer(s): Bell-Northern Research; Nortel; Forethought, Inc; Microsoft
- Known for: Invented PowerPoint
- Spouse: Leanna Koehn (m. 1966)

Robert Gaskins is an American software developer. He is one of the creators of PowerPoint, and an expert and author on the history of the English concertina.

== Education and professional work ==
Gaskins was educated in Computer Science at University of California, Berkeley, and subsequently did interdisciplinary graduate study in literature and computing.

In the early 1980s Gaskins worked five years as manager of computer science research at Bell Northern Research, an international telecommunications R&D laboratory in Silicon Valley. Subsequently, he joined Forethought, Inc., where the development of PowerPoint was begun.

Gaskins was the entrepreneur behind the development of PowerPoint, later known as Microsoft PowerPoint after acquisition by Microsoft in the early 1990s. Lee Gomes wrote in The Wall Street Journal:

Robert Gaskins was the visionary entrepreneur who in the mid-1980s realized that the huge but largely invisible market for preparing business slides was a perfect match for the coming generation of graphics-oriented computers.

Many original documents written by Robert Gaskins during the early history of PowerPoint's strategy and development are online for public access.

After leaving Microsoft, Gaskins became somewhat renowned as an expert on the history of the English concertina.
