= Caligari Corporation =

American software company, 1985–2008

- Formerly: Octree Software (1986–1993)
- Industry: software animation
- Founded: 1985
- Founder: Roman Ormandy
- Defunct: 2009
- Fate: Acquired by Microsoft

Caligari Corporation was a 3D animation and modelling software company founded in 1985 by Roman Ormandy. It is best known for trueSpace, a 3D modelling and rendering application for Windows that the company developed from 1994 onwards. Caligari was acquired by Microsoft in early 2008, and the trueSpace product was discontinued by Microsoft in 2009.

== History ==
Ormandy began developing a prototype 3D video animation package for the Amiga computer in 1985, leading to the formation of Octree Software in 1986. Between 1988 and 1992, Octree released a series of 3D graphics packages for the Amiga platform — Caligari1, Caligari2, Caligari Broadcast and Caligari 24 — aimed at professional video production and corporate presentation work.

In 1993, Octree Software relocated from New York to California and rebranded as Caligari Corporation. The following year, in 1994, the company released trueSpace 1.0 for Windows, bringing affordable professional-grade 3D modelling and animation to the PC platform.

In early 2008, Caligari Corporation was acquired by Microsoft. On 21 May 2009, Caligari announced that Microsoft would cease support for trueSpace. The website and associated forums were shut down from 22 May 2009.
