= Ribbon (user interface) =

Graphical user interface element

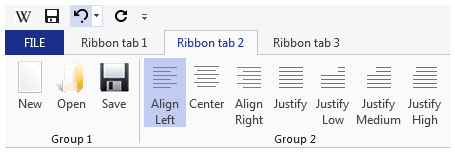
Example of a ribbon, an element of graphical user interfaces

In graphical user interface design, a ribbon is a control element in the form of a set of toolbars placed on several tabs. The typical structure of a ribbon includes large, tabbed toolbars, filled with graphical buttons and other graphical control elements, grouped by functionality. Such ribbons use tabs to expose different sets of controls, eliminating the need for numerous parallel toolbars. Contextual tabs are tabs that appear only when the user needs them. For instance, in a word processor, an image-related tab may appear when the user selects an image in a document, allowing the user to interact with that image.

Use of the term "ribbon" dates back to the 1980s and was originally used as a synonym for plain toolbar. However, in 2007, Microsoft used the term to refer to its own implementation of tabbed toolbars encompassing a conglomerate of controls for Microsoft Office 2007, which Microsoft calls "The Fluent UI". Although Microsoft popularized the term with a new meaning, similar tabbed layouts of controls existed in prior software from other vendors, including 3D Studio Max R3 and later, Adobe Dreamweaver, Borland Delphi, Sausage Software HotDog, and Macromedia HomeSite.

== Early use ==
Use of a ribbon interface dates from the early 1990s in productivity software such as Microsoft Word and WordStar as an alternative term for toolbar: It was defined as a portion of a graphical user interface consisting of a horizontal row of graphical control elements (e.g., including buttons of various sizes and drop-down lists containing icons), typically user-configurable.

A toolbar interface, called the "ribbon", has been a feature of Word from the early MS-DOS-based Word 5.5 (ca. 1990) and the first Windows-based versions (activated by the "View |Ribbon" menu option), for which early advertising referred to the use of "the Ribbon to replace an endless string of commands to let you format characters by eye instead of memory".

== Microsoft software ==
The tabbed ribbon as introduced in Microsoft Office 2007
The redesigned tabbed ribbon as introduced in Microsoft Office 2021

With the release of Microsoft Office 2007 came the "Fluent User Interface" or "Fluent UI", which replaced menu bars and customizable toolbars with a single "Office menu", a miniature toolbar known as "quick-access toolbar" and what came to be known as the ribbon: multiple tabs, each holding a toolbar bearing buttons and occasionally other controls. Toolbar controls have assorted sizes and are classified in visually distinguishable groups. The new design was intended to alleviate the problem of users not finding or knowing of the existence of available features in the Office suite. The name "ribbon" was later purported to have originated from an early design idea by which commands were placed on a long pane that could be rolled like a medieval scroll; the name was retained after the scrolling mechanism was replaced by tabs.

Microsoft applications implementing ribbons each have a different set of tabs which house user controls for that application. Within each tab, various related controls may be grouped together. Double-clicking the active tab or clicking the "Minimize" button hides the command panel, leaving only the tabs visible. Repeating this action reveals the pane. The ribbon consolidates the functionality formerly found in menus, toolbars and occasionally task panes into one area.

In Microsoft Office 2007, only Word, Excel, Access and PowerPoint implemented ribbons. With the release of Microsoft Office 2010, however, ribbons were implemented in the rest of the Microsoft Office applications. Microsoft Office 2010 also added additional end-user customization support to its user interface.

Microsoft gradually implemented the Ribbon in some of its other software. The fourth wave of Windows Live Essentials applications, including Mail, Photo Gallery, Movie Maker and Writer, featured a ribbon. Since Windows 7, Paint and WordPad feature ribbons. On Windows 8, File Explorer followed suit. Ribbons also appeared in SQL Server Report Builder, Dynamics CRM 2011, Microsoft Mathematics v4.0, the desktop client for Microsoft Power BI, and some other programs that have since been retired.

A redesigned tabbed ribbon has been introduced, as part of the Office UI redesign in Microsoft Office 2021.

The development history of the Ribbon, presented by Jensen Harris in 2008, can be seen here.

== Other software developers ==
Since the introduction of ribbons in Microsoft Office 2007, there has been an increase in the use of this type of interface in applications created by other developers, especially those creating tools for Microsoft-related products. Microsoft facilitated the adoption with the releases of Windows 8, Windows 7 and the Windows Vista platform update, which included built-in ribbon framework APIs, introduced to allow developers to integrate a ribbon toolbar into their applications. The Nielsen Norman Group published some examples in a 2008 GUI showcase report.

In June 2008, Red Flag Software released RedOffice 4.0 beta, a Chinese fork of OpenOffice.org including a new user interface that used many ribbon ideas in its design. In November 2008 Sun Microsystems started the project Renaissance to improve the user interface of OpenOffice.org. So far the prototypes of the project are frequently seen as similar to ribbons, but this has resulted in some criticism from users.

In July 2011, Avid Tech added a ribbon interface under Microsoft license to Version 7.0 of their Sibelius (scorewriter) music notation application, replacing the menu navigation system of prior versions. This met with considerable user resistance, however the ribbon interface has remained integral to the current GUI.

In September 2012, MathWorks introduced a ribbon interface (known as "Toolstrip") in MATLAB R2012b.

In February 2019, LibreOffice 6.2 added a user interface variant called "Tabbed" which mimics the Microsoft Office Ribbons.

== Reaction ==
Prior to Microsoft's introduction of ribbons in Office 2007, the user interface for its Office suites had barely changed since the introduction of Office 97 on 19 November 1996. (Office 2000 and Office 2003 released relatively minor upgrades compared to Office 97, which itself was considered to be something of a milestone compared to Office 95.)

Because of this, users became accustomed to this style of interface, which was common in many productivity products at the time. When Microsoft implemented ribbons, it was met with mixed reactions. Jeff Atwood thought the new system made menus obsolete as a cornerstone of the WIMP interface when it was first revealed in 2005. Redmondmag.com reported that power users feel the ribbons take "too much time and patience to learn." Richard Ericson from Computerworld noted that experienced users might find difficulties adapting to the new interface, and that some tasks take more key-presses or clicks to activate. Though the ribbon can be hidden by double-clicking on the open tab, PC World wrote that the ribbons crowd the Office work area, especially for notebook users; the customization options available in the original version didn't allow users to rearrange or remove the predefined commands, although it could be minimized. Others have called its large icons distracting. An online survey conducted by ExcelUser reports that a majority of respondents had a negative opinion of the change, with advanced users being "somewhat more negative" than intermediate users; the self-estimated reduction in productivity was an average of about 20%, and "about 35%" for people with a negative opinion.

Other users claim that once the new interface is learned, the average user can create "professional-looking documents faster". One study reported fairly good acceptance by users except highly experienced users and users of word processing applications with a classical WIMP interface, but was less convinced in terms of efficiency and organisation.

The decision to abolish menus has been likened to the Coca-Cola company's infamous New Coke campaign in its abandonment of the existing user base. Microsoft Office 2011 for the Macintosh, while employing the ribbon, also retains the menu system in the Mac menu bar.

== Patent controversy ==
Tabbed toolbars, as found in Macromedia HomeSite and Lotus eSuite, have been proposed as prior art for ribbons.

Proponents of free software, such as KDE developer Jarosław Staniek, have expressed beliefs that patents regarding ribbons cannot be acquired due to the ubiquity of prior art. Staniek notes that the ribbon concept has historically appeared extensively as "tabbed toolbars" in applications such as Sausage Software HotDog, Macromedia HomeSite, Dreamweaver, and Borland Delphi. Lotus developed early ribbon UIs for its eSuite product. Screenshots are still available in an IBM redbook about eSuite (page 109ff).

On 13 February 2018, a jury from the Northern District of California found that Corel Corporation had infringed on several Microsoft ribbon design patents and ribbon utility patents regarding the Fluent UI.

== See also ==
- Ribbon Hero and Ribbon Hero 2 – educational video games that train the users on ribbons
- Metro (design language) – design language behind the user interface of Windows Phone and Windows 8
- Windows Aero – Microsoft user interface for Windows Vista and Windows 7
