= HCT116 cells =

Human colon cancer cell line

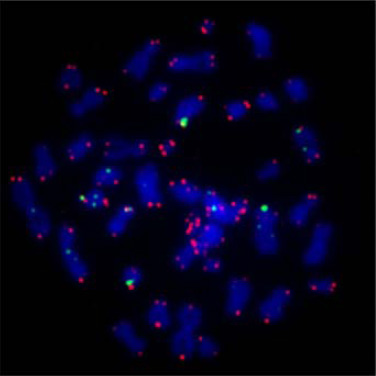
HCT116 cells stained for γ‐H2AX (green) and telomeric DNA (red)

HCT116 is a human colon cancer cell line used in therapeutic research and drug screenings.

== Characteristics ==
HCT116 cells have a mutation in codon 13 of the KRAS proto-oncogene, and are suitable transfection targets for gene therapy research. The cells have an epithelial morphology and can metastasize in xenograft models. When transducted with viral vectors carrying the p53 gene, HCT116 cells remain arrested in the G1 phase. The proliferation of HCT116 colonies was found to be inhibited by 5-FU/P85 copolymer micelles. Furthermore, it was found that the knockout of MARCH2 limited growth of HCT116 cells via stress on the endoplasmic reticulum.

== Use in research ==
HCT116 cells are used in a variety of biomedical studies involving colon cancer proliferation and corresponding inhibitors. The cell line has been used in tumorigenicity studies, along with other research that has shown that Cyclin D1 holds large importance for the activity of lithocholic acid hydroxyamide. HCT116 cells can also function in xenografts, with docetaxel, 5-FU, and flavopiridol limiting tumor growth in vitro.

The HCT116 cell line was found to have two variations; one with a large expression of the Insp8 gene, and the other without. The Insp8 gene is part of a cell's energy metabolism process, and can affect the cellular phenotype as a result.
