= Ribbon Hero =

2010 video game

- Ribbon Hero running on Microsoft Word 2010
- Developer: Microsoft Office Labs
- Publisher: Microsoft
- Release: January 19, 2010; 16 years ago
- Genres: Puzzle video game, interactive tutorial
- Mode: Single player

Ribbon Hero is a video game developed by Microsoft Office Labs. The game is available as a free download and serves to educate users of Microsoft Office 2007 and 2010 how to use the ribbon interface. It is followed by the sequel Ribbon Hero 2: Clippy's Second Chance.

== Gameplay ==
Ribbon Hero appears on the Ribbon in the supported Microsoft Office programs. Once opened, it lists challenges in four sections: working with text, page design and layout, getting artistic, and quick points. Each challenge is designed to teach the user a feature of Microsoft Office, and opens an example document which the user must edit using that feature. Challenges can be played in any order, and give half the available points. The remaining points are earned by using the same feature later on (outside the game). The quick points section does not list challenges, only features which can be used outside the game to gain points.

== Facebook integration ==
Ribbon Hero integrates with Facebook, allowing users to compare scores with their friends, and to post achievements on their Facebook Wall. It is the first Office Labs project to include Facebook integration.

== Ribbon Hero 2: Clippy's Second Chance ==
Ribbon Hero 2
- The start screen of Ribbon Hero 2
- Developer: Microsoft Office Labs
- Publisher: Microsoft
- Release: April 2, 2011; 15 years ago
- Genres: Puzzle video game, interactive tutorial
- Mode: Single player

=== Plot ===
Clippy, one of the Office Assistants which were included in Microsoft Office 97 through 2003, is looking for a part-time job and requires help with his resume. However, he enters a time machine and is taken to several different time periods. He travels to the Middle Ages, Ancient Egypt, the 1960s, Ancient Greece, the Renaissance period and the future. In each time period, there are several tasks which must be completed before moving to the next period. These tasks include formatting documents, inserting graphs and pictures, and other common uses for Microsoft Office products.
