= Microsoft Office 4.x =

Office suite by Microsoft released in 1994

- Microsoft Office 4.0 running on Windows 3.1
- Developer: Microsoft
- Initial release: 17 January 1994; 32 years ago August 1994; 31 years ago (Macintosh)
- Operating system: Windows; Windows NT; Mac OS
- Platform: IA-32, Alpha, MIPS, PowerPC, Motorola 68000
- Predecessor: Microsoft Office 3.0 (1992)
- Successor: Microsoft Office 95 (1995)
- Type: Office suite
- License: Proprietary commercial software

Microsoft Office 4.0 is a major release of the Microsoft Office software suite, released by Microsoft on January 17, 1994. Coming after Microsoft Office 3.0, it was the third major release for the Microsoft Windows operating system and the fourth on the Macintosh as version 4.2, as well as the first for Windows NT as 4.2.

== Features ==
Its main components include Word 6.0, Excel 4.0a, PowerPoint 3.0, and Mail. Microsoft announced the product on October 17, 1993; version 5.0 of Excel and version 4.0 of PowerPoint were not completed in time for inclusion in Office 4.0. As a result, Microsoft offered a coupon with every purchase of Office 4.0 to customers to freely upgrade to the newer versions of Excel and PowerPoint, which were eventually released in April 1994. Microsoft's rival Lotus Development took advantage of this mishap and mocked Microsoft in advertisements of its Lotus SmartSuite. Microsoft Access is included in the Professional edition of Office 4.0, which sold for US$99 extra over the standard suite.

Microsoft Office 4.0 increased cohesion and consistent design between the different applications in the suite. The Object Linking and Embedding (OLE) 2.0 ability links content between different documents. IntelliSense is another new feature for predictive automation.

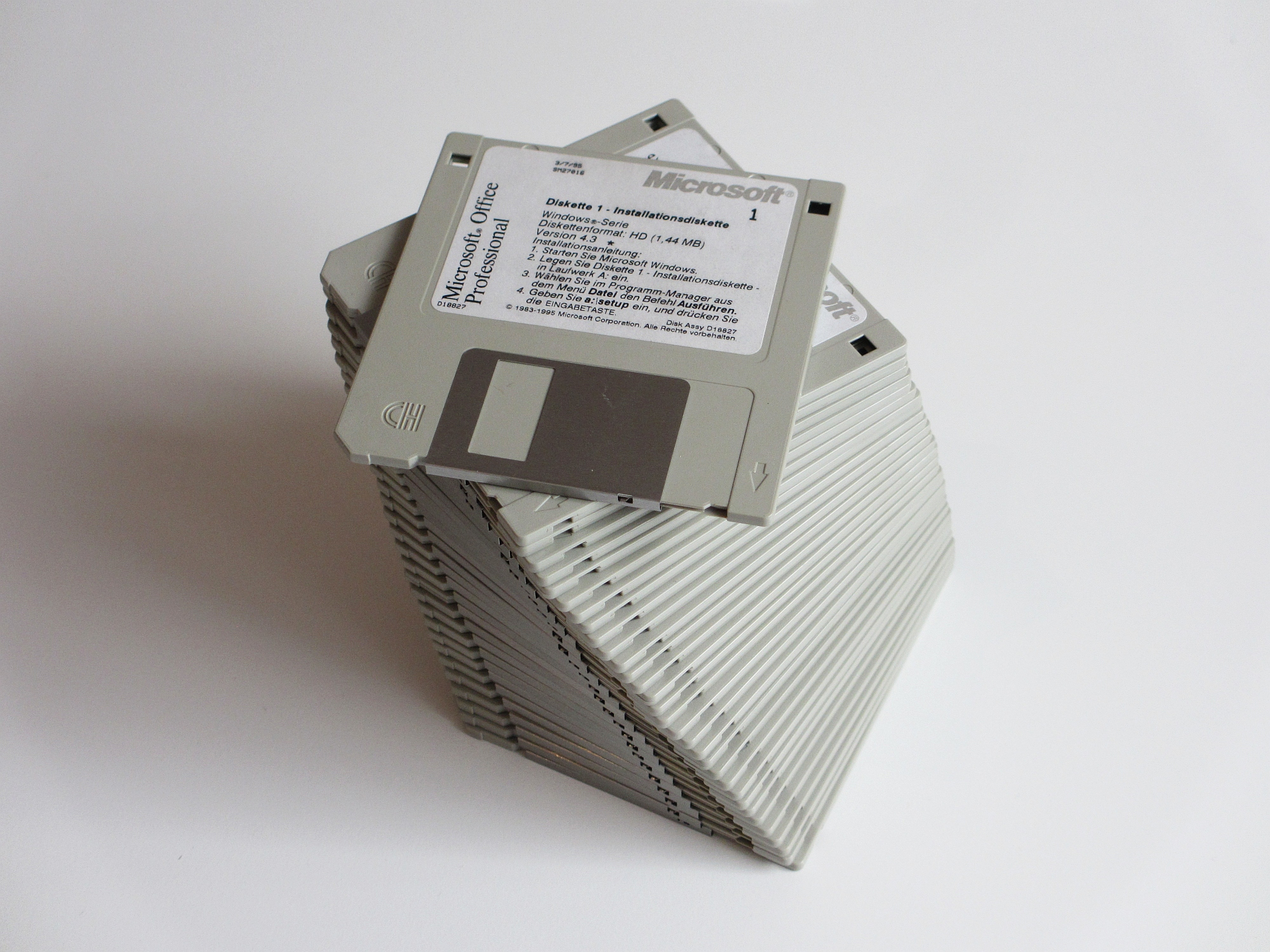
Microsoft Office 4.3 Professional floppy disk set

Microsoft Office 4.3 was released on June 2, 1994, as a Professional edition, containing the updated versions of Excel and PowerPoint within the suite as well as the new version 2.0 of Access. The Standard edition was released as Microsoft Office 4.2 for Windows 3.1. Microsoft Office for NT was released on July 3, 1994, and was the first 32-bit version of Microsoft Office and hence native for Windows NT 3.1 (i386, Alpha, MIPS and PowerPC platforms). However, the PowerPoint component remained in 16-bit. The suite was superseded by Microsoft Office for Windows 95.

In September 1994, Microsoft Office 4.2 for the Macintosh (M68k and Power Macintosh platforms) was released. The Macintosh version is also cohesive and now shares an identical interface with the Windows version of Office 4.x. The Standard Version 4.2.1 was a maintenance release in April 1995. This update also rebranded and debuted the Office jigsaw icon. In January 1997 an Enhanced release came with extra essential business tools and with Microsoft Bookshelf CD-ROM reference library.

== System requirements ==
=== Microsoft Office 4.2 for Macintosh ===
- A Mac OS-compatible computer equipped with a 68020 or higher processor or a PowerPC processor.
- System 7 operating system or later.
- At least 8 MB of physical RAM.
- Sufficient hard disk space, depending on installation: min. 18 MB to max. 35 MB.
- An 8-bit color or 4-bit grayscale display with at least 640 × 400 resolution.
