= Microsoft Office 3.0 =

Office suite by Microsoft released in 1992

- Microsoft Office 3.0 running on Windows NT 4.0
- Developer: Microsoft
- Initial release: 30 August 1992; 33 years ago
- Operating system: Microsoft Windows
- Website: office.microsoft.com/it-it/default.aspx

Microsoft Office 3.0 is a version of Microsoft Office, the second major release for the Microsoft Windows operating system and the third on the Macintosh. Omitting version 2 entirely on Windows, Microsoft released Office 3.0 on August 30, 1992.

Its main components included Word 2.0c, Excel 4.0a, PowerPoint 3.0, and Mail, a network messaging client. Previously, these components were distributed separately for Windows, and it was with Microsoft Office that they were combined as a full office suite. Versions for Macintosh were also updated to Word 5.1, which didn't exist for Windows.

It was superseded by Microsoft Office 4.0.
