= Microsoft Office 2019 =

Version of the Microsoft Office productivity suite

- Clockwise from top left: Word, Excel, Outlook and PowerPoint
- Developer: Microsoft
- Release: September 24, 2018; 7 years ago

Stable release(s) [±]
- Retail: 2509 (Build 19231.20194) / October 14, 2025; 10 months ago
- Volume licensed: 1808 (Build 10417.20197) / August 11, 2026; 14 days ago
- Operating system: Windows 10 v1809 or later Windows Server 2019 or later
- Platform: IA-32, x64, ARM64
- Predecessor: Microsoft Office 2016 (2015)
- Successor: Microsoft Office 2021 (2021)
- Available in: 102 languages
- List of languages: Full (40): English, Arabic, Bulgarian, Chinese (Simplified), Chinese (Traditional), Croatian, Czech, Danish, Dutch, Estonian, Finnish, French, German, Greek, Hebrew, Hindi, Hungarian, Indonesian, Italian, Japanese, Kazakh, Korean, Latvian, Lithuanian, Malay (Latin), Norwegian Bokmål, Polish, Portuguese (Brazil), Portuguese (Portugal), Romanian, Russian, Serbian (Latin, Serbia), Slovak, Slovenian, Spanish, Swedish, Thai, Turkish, Ukrainian, Vietnamese; Partial (51): Afrikaans, Albanian, Amharic, Armenian, Assamese, Azerbaijani (Latin), Bangla (Bangladesh), Bangla (Bengali India), Basque (Basque), Belarusian, Bosnian (Latin), Catalan, Dari, Filipino, Galician, Georgian, Gujarati, Icelandic, Irish, Kannada, Khmer, KiSwahili, Konkani, Kyrgyz, Luxembourgish, Macedonian (Republic of Macedonia), Malayalam, Maltese, Maori, Marathi, Mongolian (Cyrillic), Nepali, Norwegian Nynorsk, Odia, Persian (Farsi), Punjabi (Gurmukhi), Quechua, Scottish Gaelic, Serbian (Cyrillic, Bosnia & Herzegovina), Serbian (Cyrillic, Serbia), Sindhi (Arabic), Sinhala, Tamil, Tatar (Cyrillic), Telugu, Turkmen (Latin), Urdu, Uyghur, Uzbek (Latin), Valencian, Welsh; Proofing only (11): Hausa, Igbo, isiXhosa, isiZulu, Kinyarwanda, Pashto, Romansh, Sesotho sa Leboa, Setswana, Wolof, Yoruba
- Type: Office suite
- License: Trialware, software as a service
- Website: Microsoft Office 2019 (Archived at Wayback Machine)

Microsoft Office 2019 for Mac
- Developer: Microsoft
- Release: September 24, 2018; 7 years ago
- Stable release: 16.78 (23100802) (October 10, 2023; 2 years ago) [±]
- Operating system: macOS Sierra or later
- Platform: x64, ARM64
- Predecessor: Microsoft Office 2016 (2015)
- Successor: Microsoft Office 2021 (2021)
- Available in: 27 languages
- List of languages English, Arabic, Chinese (Simplified), Chinese (Traditional), Czech, Danish, Dutch, Finnish, French, German, Greek, Hebrew, Hungarian, Indonesian, Italian, Japanese, Korean, Norwegian (Bokmål), Polish, Portuguese (Portugal), Portuguese (Brazil), Russian, Slovak, Spanish, Swedish, Thai, Turkish

Microsoft Office 2019 (second release codenamed Office 16) is a version of Microsoft Office for both Windows and Mac. It was unveiled on April 27, 2018, for Microsoft Windows and June 12, 2018, for macOS, and launched on September 24, 2018. Some features that had previously been restricted to Office 365 subscribers are available in this release. Office 2019 retains the same major version number of 16, making it the second perpetual release of Office 16. Office 2019 is compatible with Windows 10 v1809 and Windows Server 2019 through Windows 11 v23H2 and Windows Server 2022. It is also compatible with macOS Sierra through macOS Sequoia and macOS 27. Unlike other versions of Microsoft Office, Office 2019 received only two years of extended support, which ended on October 14, 2025.

== History ==
Microsoft Office 2019 was officially released on September 24, 2018, for Microsoft Windows and macOS, following a preview phase earlier that year. Office 2019 was designed for users who preferred a perpetual license model, offering a one-time purchase option, in contrast to the subscription-based Office 365 (now Microsoft 365). While it includes essential productivity tools, Office 2019 does not receive future feature updates beyond its initial release.

=== Development and release ===
On April 27, 2018, Microsoft launched the Office 2019 Commercial Preview for Windows, providing enterprise customers and IT professionals with early access to the new suite. The Commercial Preview allowed these users to test the product in professional environments and provide feedback, which helped Microsoft refine the final release. This version was particularly aimed at businesses preferring a traditional licensing model instead of adopting Microsoft's subscription-based Office 365 service.

The macOS version of the Office 2019 Commercial Preview followed on June 12, 2018, continuing Microsoft’s support for cross-platform users. By offering the preview on both major operating systems, Microsoft ensured that its new features and functionality could be tested across diverse environments.

Following this preview phase, the official stable release of Office 2019 was made available to the public on September 24, 2018. Unlike Office 365, which provides regular cloud-based feature updates, Office 2019 was designed to remain static in terms of feature development, making it an attractive option for users who preferred a stable, non-evolving platform for productivity.

=== Updates and support ===
Although Office 2019 did not receive feature updates like Office 365, Microsoft regularly releases security and quality updates for the suite. These updates were typically provided once a month on Patch Tuesday (the second Tuesday of each month), ensuring that the software remained secure and reliable.

The mainstream support phase for Office 2019 extended until October 10, 2023, after which extended support continued until October 14, 2025.

In 2026, Microsoft announced that due to an expiring digital certificate for license validation that cannot be updated due to the end of support, all Office 2019 for macOS licenses will cease to function on July 13, 2026; the software will only be usable in read-only mode, and will be rendered incapable of editing documents.

=== Reception ===
Office 2019 received attention for offering a non-subscription alternative to Office 365, which attracted users preferring a more traditional licensing model. However, it was also noted that the suite lacked some of the advanced, cloud-based features available in Office 365, which receives regular updates with new functionalities.

== New features ==
Office 2019 includes many of the features previously published via Office 365, along with improved inking features, LaTeX support in Word, new animation features in PowerPoint including the morph and zoom features, and new formulas and charts in Excel for data analysis.

OneNote is absent from the suite as the Universal Windows Platform (UWP) version of OneNote bundled with Windows replaces it. OneNote 2016 can be installed as an optional feature on the Office Installer.

For Mac users, Focus Mode was brought to Word, 2D maps were brought to Excel and new Morph transitions, SVG support and 4K video exports came to PowerPoint, among other features.

Despite being released in the same month, the new Office user interface in Word, Excel, PowerPoint, and Outlook is only available to Office 365 subscribers, not perpetual Office 2019 licenses.

== Editions ==
=== Traditional editions ===
Microsoft Office 2019 has the same perpetual SKU editions aimed towards different markets. Like its predecessor, Microsoft Office 2019 contains Word, Excel, PowerPoint and OneNote and is licensed for use on one computer.

5 perpetual SKU editions of Office 2019 were released for Windows:

- Home & Student: This retail suite includes the core applications only – Word, Excel, PowerPoint, OneNote.
- Home & Business: This retail suite includes the core applications and Outlook.
- Standard: This suite, only available through volume licensing channels, includes the core applications, as well as Outlook and Publisher.
- Professional: This retail suite includes the core applications, as well as Outlook, Publisher, and Access.
- Professional Plus: This suite includes the core applications, as well as Outlook, Publisher, Access, and Skype for Business. This edition is available through retail channels (Developer tools subscription like MSDN subscription & Visual Studio subscription）and volume licensing channels.

Application(s)	Home & Student	Home & Business	Standard	Professional	Professional Plus
Core applications	Yes	Yes	Yes	Yes	Yes
Outlook	No	Yes	Yes	Yes	Yes
Publisher	No	No	Yes	Yes	Yes
Access	No	No	No	Yes	Yes
Skype for Business	No	No	No	No	Yes

Unlike its predecessor, both Windows version retail & volume versions use the Click-to-Run (C2R) for installation.

Like its predecessor, three traditional editions of Office 2019 were released for Mac:

- Home & Student: This retail suite includes the core applications only.
- Home & Business: This retail suite includes the core applications and Outlook.
- Standard: This suite, only available through volume licensing channels, includes the core applications and Outlook.

== macOS support ==
Office 2019 for Mac
macOS version	Last supported release	Last update release date
macOS 11 Big Sur	16.77.1 (23091703)	September 19, 2023
macOS 10.15 Catalina	16.66.2 (22102801)	October 31, 2022
macOS 10.14 Mojave	16.54 (21101001)	October 12, 2021
macOS 10.13 High Sierra	16.43 (20110804)	November 10, 2020
macOS 10.12 Sierra	16.30 (19101301)	October 15, 2019
OS X 10.11 and 10.10	16.16.27 (Office 2016)	August 14, 2018

All releases can be downloaded from Microsoft's Update history for Office for Mac page.

== See also ==
- List of office suites
- List of typefaces included with Microsoft Windows (list of Office Cloud fonts continues in footnote)
