= Microsoft Office 95 =

Office suite by Microsoft released in 1995

- Microsoft Office 95 applications from top-left: Word, Excel, Access and PowerPoint
- Developer: Microsoft
- Release: August 24, 1995; 31 years ago
- Final release: 7.0b / October 7, 1999; 27 years ago
- Operating system: Windows NT 3.51 or later
- Platform: IA-32
- Predecessor: Microsoft Office 4.3 (1994)
- Successor: Microsoft Office 97 (1996)
- Standard: OLE 2.0
- Type: Office suite
- License: Proprietary commercial software
- Website: Microsoft Office 95 (Archived at Wayback Machine)

Microsoft Office 95 (version 7.0) (Note: Also known as Microsoft Office for Windows 95) is the fourth major release of the Microsoft Office office suite for Windows systems, released by Microsoft on August 24, 1995 alongside Windows 95. It is the successor to both Office 4.2 and 4.3, and it bumps up the version number of both the suite itself and all its components to 7.0, so that each Office program's number matches the rest, as well as being the first release of Office for all components to be fully 32-bit, unlike previous releases. The suite is officially compatible with Windows NT 3.51 through Windows 2000. It was superseded by Microsoft Office 97 and support ended on December 31, 2001. It is the last version of Microsoft Office to support Windows NT 3.51 RTM–SP4.

== Features ==
Microsoft Office 95 includes six applications: Word (a word processor), Excel (a spreadsheet editor), PowerPoint (a presentation program), Access (a database management system), Schedule+ (a time management app) and Binder (a program for binding the work of the mentioned apps together). The CD-ROM version includes Microsoft Bookshelf.

Previously, Microsoft had released Office 4.2 for Windows NT for several architectures, which included 32‑bit Word 6.0 for Windows NT and Excel 5.0 for Windows NT, but PowerPoint 4.0 and the Office Manager were 16‑bit. With Office 95, all components in the suite were 32-bit. All the Office 95 programs are OLE 2-enabled, meaning that they allow interoperability between themselves and other applications that support the protocol. Binder uses this protocol to bind OLE objects together.

Office 95 moves the version number of its applications to 7.0 to match Word's version number. Other components bear the same version numbers to show that they are contemporaries, although their predecessors are not version 6.0. The previous versions of components are Word 6.0, Excel 5.0, PowerPoint 4.0, Schedule+ 1.0 and Access 2.0. Binder had no predecessor at the time.

The Office 95 programs utilize a two-tone gradient in the title bar at the top of the window, gradually turning from black at the left side to dark blue at the right. At the time, this was unique to Office 95 and Microsoft Works 4.0; no other programs running under Windows 95 or Windows NT utilized gradient title bars. This feature was eventually incorporated into the shell of Windows 98 and later, which would allow customizable gradient colors and extend the feature to include dialog boxes as well.

Microsoft Excel contains an Easter egg, a hidden Doom–like game called Hall of Tortured Souls crediting the application's writers.

=== Contemporaneous components ===
Additional programs have been marketed as "compatible with Microsoft Office 95":

- Microsoft Project (Version 4.1a)
- Microsoft Publisher (Version 3.0)
- Microsoft FrontPage 1.1
- Office Small Business Pack
- Small Business Financial Manager for Excel

Other contemporaneous Microsoft products include:

- Microsoft Works 4.0
- Microsoft Money 4.0

== Editions ==
Computer icons of the components Microsoft Office 95 Pro: From left to right, Word, Excel, PowerPoint, Access, Schedule+ and Binder

Office 95 is available in two versions. They contain the following applications:

Comparison of Office 95 editions
| Application | Standard Edition | Professional Edition |
|---|---|---|
| Word | Yes | Yes |
| Excel | Yes | Yes |
| PowerPoint | Yes | Yes |
| Schedule+ | Yes | Yes |
| Binder | Yes | Yes |
| Access | No | Yes |
| Bookshelf | No | On CD-ROM version only |

== Updates ==
Two updated versions, 7.0a and 7.0b were released to fix bugs in the applications, including a fix for a screen redraw problem in PowerPoint. The updates could be ordered from Microsoft Support. A downloadable update addresses issues related to the Year 2000 problem.

== Issues ==
Versions 3.0 and 3.5 of the Jet Database Engine, used by Access 7.0 and the later released Access 97 respectively, have a critical issue which makes these versions of Access unusable on a computer with more than 1 GB of memory. While this problem has been fixed for Jet 3.5/Access 97, it has never been fixed for Jet 3.0 or Access 95.

== System requirements ==
Microsoft Office 95 requires a 386DX or higher CPU, 8 MB of RAM, and Windows NT 3.51 for typical use. Regarding hard disk space, compact installations require 28 MB, "typical" installations require 55 MB, and full installations require 88 MB.
