= MARCH2 =

Protein-coding gene in the species Homo sapiens

MARCHF2

Identifiers
- Aliases: MARCHF2, MARCH-II, RNF172, HSPC240, membrane associated ring-CH-type finger 2, MARCH2
- External IDs: OMIM: 613332; MGI: 1925915; GeneCards: MARCHF2
Enzyme activity
EC #	BRENDA	ExPASy	KEGG	MetaCyc
2.3.2.27	↗	↗	↗	↗

Gene location (Human)
Chr.	Chromosome 19 (human)
Band	19p13.2	Start	8,413,270 bp
Band	19p13.2	End	8,439,017 bp

Gene location (Mouse)
Chr.	Chromosome 17 (mouse)
Band	17|17 B1	Start	33,904,666 bp
Band	17|17 B1	End	33,937,644 bp
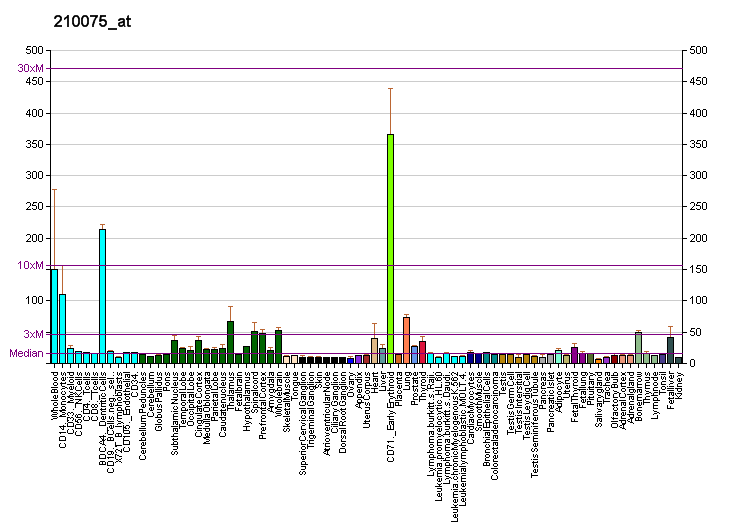
RNA expression pattern
Bgee	Human / Mouse (ortholog); Top expressed in: apex of heart; monocyte; C1 segment; muscle layer of sigmoid colon; right frontal lobe; muscle of thigh; right auricle of heart; right coronary artery; granulocyte; left ventricle / Top expressed in: blood; fetal liver hematopoietic progenitor cell; tibiofemoral joint; spleen; right kidney; muscle of thigh; interventricular septum; granulocyte; skeletal muscle tissue; superior frontal gyrus; More reference expression data
BioGPS	More reference expression data
Gene ontology
Molecular function	zinc ion binding; protein binding; metal ion binding; ubiquitin-protein transferase activity; transferase activity
Cellular component	integral component of membrane; lysosomal membrane; endosome; lysosome; endosome membrane; endoplasmic reticulum membrane; cytoplasmic vesicle; membrane; endoplasmic reticulum
Biological process	endocytosis; protein ubiquitination
Sources:Amigo / QuickGO
Orthologs
Databases	NCBI: entry; OMA: entry
Species	Human	Mouse
Entrez	51257	224703
Ensembl	ENSG00000099785	ENSMUSG00000079557
UniProt	Q9P0N8	Q99M02
RefSeq (mRNA)	NM_001005415; NM_001005416; NM_016496; NM_001369776; NM_001369777 NM_001369778; NM_001369779	NM_001252480; NM_145486
RefSeq (protein)	NP_001005415; NP_001005416; NP_057580; NP_001356705; NP_001356706 NP_001356707; NP_001356708	NP_001239409; NP_663461
Location (UCSC)	Chr 19: 8.41 – 8.44 Mb	Chr 17: 33.9 – 33.94 Mb
PubMed search
- Wikidata
View/Edit Human	View/Edit Mouse

E3 ubiquitin-protein ligase MARCHF2 is an enzyme that in humans is encoded by the MARCHF2 gene (previously MARCH2). It is a member of the MARCH family of E3 ligases, and plays an important role in the turnover of membrane proteins. MARCH2 has been shown to negatively regulate NF-κB essential modulator function upon viral and bacterial infections.

== Gene name error in excel ==
Like the other MARCH and septin genes, care must be exercised when analyzing genetic data containing the MARCH2 gene in Microsoft Excel. This is due to Excel's autocorrect feature treating the MARCH gene as a date and converting it to a standard date format. The original text cannot be recovered as a result of the conversion. A 2016 study found up to 19.6% of all papers in selected journals to be affected by the gene name error. The issue can be prevented by using an alias name such as MARCHF2, prepending with an apostrophe ('), or preformatting the cell as text.
