= Microsoft Word =

Word processor

- Microsoft Office 365 version of Microsoft Word, with the new redesign applied
- Other names: Multi-Tool Word
- Developer: Microsoft
- Release: October 25, 1983; 43 years ago

Stable release(s)
Latest versions (365 and Office)
- - Office 2024 (LTSC): 2408 (Build 17932.21056) / 13 October 2026; 27 days ago
  - Office 2021 (LTSC): 2108 (Build 14334.20974) / 13 October 2026; 27 days ago
  - Office 2019 (LTSC): 1808 (Build 10417.20207) / 13 October 2026; 27 days ago
  - Office 2024 (Retail): 2610 (Build 20527.20150) / 3 November 2026; 6 days ago
  - Office 2021 (Retail): 2609 (Build 20430.20182) / 13 October 2026; 27 days ago
  - Office 2019 (Retail): 2509 (Build 19231.20194) / 14 October 2025; 12 months ago
Latest versions (standalone app)
- - macOS: 16.114.1 / October 22, 2026; 18 days ago
  - Android: 16.0 (Build 20207.20014) / June 14, 2026; 4 months ago
  - iOS (Note: Including iPadOS and visionOS): 2.115.2 / October 26, 2026; 14 days ago
- Written in: C++ (back-end), Objective-C (API/UI on Mac)
- Operating system: Windows, macOS, Android, iOS (current versions)
- Platform: IA-32, x86-64, Arm, Arm64
- Predecessor: Multi-Tool Word or WordPad
- Type: Word processor
- License: Trialware
- Website: microsoft.com/en-us/microsoft-365/word

Microsoft Word, or simply Word, is a word processing program developed by Microsoft. It was first released on October 25, 1983, under the original name Multi-Tool Word for Xenix systems. Subsequent versions were later written for several other platforms including IBM PCs running DOS (1983), Apple Macintosh running the Classic Mac OS (1985), AT&T UNIX PC (1985), Atari ST (1988), OS/2 (1989), Microsoft Windows (1989), SCO Unix (1990), Handheld PC (1996), Pocket PC (2000), macOS (2001), Web browsers (2010), iOS (2014), and Android (2015).

Microsoft Word has been the de facto standard word processing software since the 1990s when it eclipsed WordPerfect. Commercial versions of Word are licensed as a standalone product or as a component of Microsoft Office, which can be purchased with a perpetual license, as part of the Microsoft 365 suite as a subscription, or as a one-time purchase with Office 2024.

== History ==
Microsoft Word 1.0 for DOS (1983) (using a black background, using font "IBM BIOS-2y")

In 1981, Microsoft hired Charles Simonyi, the primary developer of Bravo, the first GUI word processor, which was developed at Xerox PARC. Simonyi started work on a word processor called Multi-Tool Word and soon hired Richard Brodie, a former Xerox intern, who became the primary software engineer.

Microsoft announced Multi-Tool Word for Xenix and MS-DOS in 1983. Its name was soon simplified to Microsoft Word. Free demonstration copies of the application were bundled with the November 1983 issue of PC World, making it the first to be distributed on-disk with a magazine. That year Microsoft demonstrated Word running on Windows.

Unlike most MS-DOS programs at the time, Microsoft Word was designed to be used with a mouse. Advertisements depicted the Microsoft Mouse and described Word as a WYSIWYG (What You See Is What You Get), windowed word processor with the ability to undo and display bold, italic, and underlined text, although it could not render fonts. It was not initially popular, since its user interface was different from the leading word processor at the time, WordStar. However, Microsoft steadily improved the product, releasing versions 2.0 through 5.0 over the next six years. In 1985, Microsoft ported Word to the classic Mac OS (known as Macintosh System Software at the time). This was made easier by Word for DOS having been designed for use with high-resolution displays and laser printers, even though none were yet available to the general public. It was also notable for its very fast cut-and-paste function and unlimited number of undo operations, which are due to its usage of the piece table data structure.

Following the precedents of LisaWrite and MacWrite, Word for Mac OS added true WYSIWYG features. It fulfilled a need for a word processor that was more capable than MacWrite. By 1988 WordPerfect and Word dominated the DOS word processor market, but neither product nor any other had true WYSIWYG, unlike Mac software; after its release, Word for Mac OS's sales were higher than its MS-DOS counterpart for at least four years.

The second release of Word for Mac OS, shipped in 1987, was named Word 3.0 to synchronize its version number with Word for DOS; this was Microsoft's first attempt to synchronize version numbers across platforms. Word 3.0 included numerous internal enhancements and new features, including the first implementation of the Rich Text Format (RTF) specification, but was plagued with bugs. Within a few months, Word 3.0 was superseded by a more stable Word 3.01, which was mailed free to all registered users of 3.0. After MacWrite Pro was discontinued in the mid-1990s, Word for Mac OS never had any serious rivals. Word 5.1 for Mac OS, released in 1992, was a very popular word processor owing to its elegance, relative ease of use, and feature set. Many users say it is the best version of Word for Mac OS ever created.

In 1986, an agreement between Atari and Microsoft brought Word to the Atari ST under the name Microsoft Write. The Atari ST version was a port of Word 1.05 for the Mac OS and was never updated.

By the early 1990s, the growing popularity of Windows narrowed the word processor market to a few supporting the operating system, including Word, WordPerfect, and Ami Pro. The first version of Word for Windows was released in 1989. With the release of Windows 3.0 the following year, sales began to pick up and Microsoft soon became the market leader for word processors for IBM PC-compatible computers. In 1991, Microsoft capitalized on Word for Windows' increasing popularity by releasing a version of Word for DOS, version 5.5, that replaced its unique user interface with an interface similar to a Windows application. By then Word had more than half of the Windows word processor market. When Microsoft became aware of the Year 2000 problem, it made Microsoft Word 5.5 for DOS available for free downloads. As of January 2026, it is still available for download from Microsoft's website. In 1991, Microsoft embarked on a project code-named Pyramid to completely rewrite Microsoft Word from the ground up. Both the Windows and Mac OS versions would start from the same code base. It was abandoned when it was determined that it would take the development team too long to rewrite and then catch up with all the new capabilities that could have been added at the same time without a rewrite. Instead, the next versions of Word for Windows and Mac OS, dubbed version 6.0, both started from the code base of Word for Windows 2.0.

With the release of Word 6.0 in 1993, Microsoft again attempted to synchronize the version numbers and coordinate product naming across platforms, this time across DOS, Mac OS, and Windows (this was the last version of Word for DOS). It introduced AutoCorrect, which automatically fixed certain typing errors, and AutoFormat, which could reformat many parts of a document at once. While the Windows version received favorable reviews (e.g., from InfoWorld), the Mac OS version was widely derided. Many accused it of being slow, clumsy, and memory intensive, and its user interface differed significantly from Word 5.1. In response to user requests, Microsoft offered Word 5 again, after it had been discontinued. Subsequent versions of Word for macOS are no longer direct ports of Word for Windows, instead featuring a mixture of ported code and native code.

== File formats ==
Native file formats
- Left: The icon for .doc files. Right: The icon for .docx files. The file formats are differentiated by using the Word logo as seen in Office 2000 and the logo for the current version of Word.
- DOC: Legacy Word document
- DOT: Legacy Word templates
- WBK: Legacy Word document backup
- DOCX: XML Word document
- DOCM: XML Word macro-enabled document
- DOTX: XML Word template
- DOTM: XML Word macro-enabled template
- DOCB: XML Word binary document

=== Filename extensions ===
Microsoft Word's native file formats are denoted either by a .doc or .docx filename extension.

Although the .doc extension has been used in many different versions of Word, it actually encompasses four distinct file formats:

1. Word for DOS
2. Word for Windows 1 and 2; Word 3 and 4 for Mac OS
3. Word 6 and Word 95 for Windows; Word 6 for Mac OS
4. Word 97 and later for Windows; Word 98 and later for Mac OS

(The classic Mac OS of the era did not use filename extensions.)

The newer .docx extension signifies the Office Open XML international standard for Office documents and is used by default by Word 2007 and later for Windows as well as Word 2008 and later for macOS.

=== Binary formats (Word 97–2007) ===
During the late 1990s and early 2000s, the default Word document format (.DOC) became a de facto standard of document file formats for Microsoft Office users. There are different versions of "Word Document Format" used by default in Word 97–2007. Each binary word file is a Compound File, a hierarchical file system within a file. According to Joel Spolsky, Word Binary File Format is extremely complex mainly because its developers had to accommodate an overwhelming number of features and prioritize performance over anything else.

As with all OLE Compound Files, Word Binary Format consists of "storages", which are analogous to computer folders, and "streams", which are similar to computer files. Each storage may contain streams or other storage. Each Word Binary File must contain a stream called the "WordDocument" stream and this stream must start with a File Information Block (FIB). FIB serves as the first point of reference for locating everything else, such as where the text in a Word document starts, ends, what version of Word created the document and other attributes.

Word 2007 and later continue to support the DOC file format, although it is no longer the default.

=== XML Document (Word 2003) ===
The .docx XML format introduced in Word 2003 was a simple, XML-based format called WordProcessingML or WordML.

The Microsoft Office XML formats are XML-based document formats (or XML schemas) introduced in versions of Microsoft Office prior to Office 2007. Microsoft Office XP introduced a new XML format for storing Excel spreadsheets and Office 2003 added an XML-based format for Word documents.

These formats were succeeded by Office Open XML (ECMA-376) in Microsoft Office 2007.

=== Cross-version compatibility ===
Opening a Word Document file in a version of Word other than the one with which it was created can cause an incorrect display of the document. The document formats of the various versions change in subtle and not-so-subtle ways (such as changing the font or the handling of more complex tasks like footnotes). Formatting created in newer versions does not always survive when viewed in older versions of the program, nearly always because that capability does not exist in the previous version. Rich Text Format (RTF), an early effort to create a format for interchanging formatted text between applications, is an optional format for Word that retains most formatting and all content of the original document.

=== Third-party formats ===
Plugins permitting the Windows versions of Word to read and write formats it does not natively support, such as international standard OpenDocument format (ODF) (ISO/IEC 26300:2006), are available. Up until the release of Service Pack 2 (SP2) for Office 2007, Word did not natively support reading or writing ODF documents without a plugin, namely the SUN ODF Plugin or the OpenXML/ODF Translator. With SP2 installed, ODF format 1.1 documents can be read and saved like any other supported format in addition to those already available in Word 2007. The implementation faces substantial criticism, and the ODF Alliance and others have claimed that the third-party plugins provide better support. Microsoft later declared that the ODF support has some limitations.

In October 2005, one year before the Microsoft Office 2007 suite was released, Microsoft declared that there was insufficient demand from Microsoft customers for the international standard OpenDocument format support and that therefore it would not be included in Microsoft Office 2007. This statement was repeated in the following months. As an answer, on October 20, 2005, an online petition was created to demand ODF support from Microsoft.

In May 2006, the ODF plugin for Microsoft Office was released by the OpenDocument Foundation. Microsoft declared that it had no relationship with the developers of the plugin.

In July 2006, Microsoft announced the creation of the Open XML Translator project – tools to build a technical bridge between the Microsoft Office Open XML Formats and the OpenDocument Format (ODF). This work was started in response to government requests for interoperability with ODF. The goal of the project was not to add ODF support to Microsoft Office, but only to create a plugin and an external toolset. In February 2007, this project released a first version of the ODF plugin for Microsoft Word.

In February 2007, Sun released an initial version of its ODF plugin for Microsoft Office. Version 1.0 was released in July 2007.

Microsoft Word 2007 (Service Pack 1) supports (for output only) PDF and XPS formats, but only after manual installation of the Microsoft "Save as PDF or XPS" add-on. On later releases, this was offered by default.

== Features ==
Among its features, Word includes a built-in spell checker, a thesaurus, a dictionary, and utilities for manipulating and editing text. It supports creating tables. Depending on the version, it can perform simple and complex calculations, and supports formatting formulas and equations.

The following are some aspects of its feature set.

=== Templates ===
Several later versions of Word include the ability for users to create their own formatting templates, allowing them to define a file in which: the title, heading, paragraph, and other element designs differ from the standard Word templates. Users can find how to do this under the Help section located near the top right corner (Word 2013 on Windows 8).

For example, Normal.dotm is the master template from which all Word documents are created. It determines the margin defaults as well as the layout of the text and font defaults. Although Normal.dotm is already set with certain defaults, the user can change it to new defaults. This will change other documents which were created using the template. It was previously Normal.dot.

=== Image formats ===
Word can import and display images in common bitmap formats such as JPG and GIF. It can also be used to create and display simple line art. Microsoft Word added support for the common SVG vector image format in 2017 for Office 365 ProPlus subscribers and this functionality was also included in the Office 2019 release.

=== WordArt ===
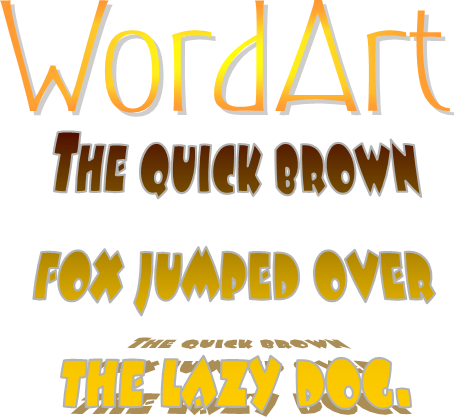
An example image created with WordArt

WordArt enables drawing text in a Microsoft Word document such as a title, watermark, or other text, with graphical effects such as skewing, shadowing, rotating, stretching in a variety of shapes and colors, and even including three-dimensional effects. Users can apply formatting effects such as shadow, bevel, glow, and reflection to their document text as easily as applying bold or underline. Users can also spell-check text that uses visual effects and add text effects to paragraph styles.

=== Macros ===
Macros may be used for frequent or repetitive sequences of keystrokes and mouse movements. Like other Microsoft Office documents, Word files can include advanced macros and even embedded programs. The language was originally WordBasic, but changed to Visual Basic for Applications as of Word 97.

This extensive functionality can also be used to run and propagate viruses in documents. The tendency for people to exchange Word documents via email, USB flash drives, and floppy disks made this an especially attractive vector in 1999. A prominent example was the Melissa virus, but countless others have existed.

These macro viruses were the only known cross-platform threats between Windows and Macintosh computers. Microsoft released patches for Word X and Word 2004 that effectively eliminated the macro problem on the Mac by 2006.

Word's macro security setting, which regulates when macros may execute, can be adjusted by the user, but in the most recent versions of Word, it is set to HIGH by default, generally reducing the risk from macro-based viruses, which have become uncommon.

=== Layout issues ===
Before Word 2010 (Word 14) for Windows, the program was unable to correctly handle ligatures defined in OpenType fonts. Those ligature glyphs with Unicode codepoints may be inserted manually, but are not recognized by Word for what they are, breaking spell checking, while custom ligatures present in the font are not accessible at all. Since Word 2010, the program now has advanced typesetting features which can be enabled, OpenType ligatures, kerning and hyphenation (previous versions already had the latter two features). Other layout deficiencies of Word include the inability to set crop marks or thin spaces. Various third-party workaround utilities have been developed.

In Word 2004 for Mac OS X, support of complex scripts was inferior even to Word 97 and Word 2004 did not support Apple Advanced Typography features like ligatures or glyph variants.

=== Issues with technical documents ===
Microsoft Word is only partially suitable for some kinds of technical writing, specifically, that which requires mathematical equations, figure placement, table placement and cross-references to any of these items. The usual workaround for equations is to use a third-party equation typesetter. Figures and tables must be placed manually; there is an anchor mechanism but it is not designed for fully automatic figure placement, and editing text after placing figures and tables often requires re-placing those items by moving the anchor point, and even then the placement options are limited. This problem is deeply baked into Word's structure since 1985, as it does not know where page breaks will occur until the document is printed.

=== Bullets and numbering ===
Microsoft Word supports bullet lists and numbered lists. It also features a numbering system that helps add correct numbers to pages, chapters, headers, footnotes, and entries of tables of content; these numbers automatically change to correct ones as new items are added or existing items are deleted. Bullets and numbering can be applied directly to paragraphs and converted to lists. Word 97 through 2003, however, had problems adding correct numbers to numbered lists. In particular, a second irrelevant numbered list might have not started with number one but instead resumed numbering after the last numbered list. Although Word 97 supported a hidden marker that said the list numbering must restart afterward, the command to insert this marker (Restart Numbering command) was only added in Word 2003. However, if one were to cut the first item of the listed and paste it as another item (e.g. fifth), then the restart marker would have moved with it and the list would have restarted in the middle instead of at the top.

Word continues to default to non-Unicode characters and non-hierarchical bulleting, despite user preference for PowerPoint-style symbol hierarchies (e.g., filled circle/emdash/filled square/endash/emptied circle) and universal compatibility.

=== AutoSummarize ===
Available in certain versions of Word (e.g., Word 2007), AutoSummarize highlights passages or phrases that it considers valuable and can be a quick way of generating a crude abstract or an executive summary. The amount of text to be retained can be specified by the user as a percentage of the current amount of text.

According to Ron Fein of the Word 97 team, AutoSummarize cuts wordy copy to the bone by counting words and ranking sentences. First, AutoSummarize identifies the most common words in the document (barring "a" and "the" and the like) and assigns a "score" to each word – the more frequently a word is used, the higher the score. Then, it "averages" each sentence by adding the scores of its words and dividing the sum by the number of words in the sentence – the higher the average, the higher the rank of the sentence. "It's like the ratio of wheat to chaff," explains Fein.

AutoSummarize was removed from Microsoft Word for Mac OS X 2011, although it was present in Word for Mac 2008. AutoSummarize was removed from the Office 2010 release version (14) as well.

=== Spike ===
Spike is a specialized cut command in Microsoft Word. It is named after an implement in restaurants on which receipts are impaled, and similarly sequentially stores data to be pasted and adds them together to the document when the second function step, or paste, is performed. Spiking (CONTROL–F3) performs a cut function, which can be immediately undone to simulate a "copy" command, while the pasting function (SHIFT–CONTROL–F3) will also clear the data from the spike, although this can be avoided by using alternatives to the three-key shortcut.

=== Hidden text ===
Word supports marking selected text as "hidden". Hidden text is text that is stored in the document but is not displayed. For example, pages containing large amounts of markup language text can be made visually more readable during the editing process.

=== Password protection ===
Three password types can be set in Microsoft Word:

- Password to open a document
- Password to modify a document
- Password restricting formatting and editing

The second and third password types were developed by Microsoft for convenient shared use of documents rather than for their protection. There is no encryption of documents that are protected by such passwords and the Microsoft Office protection system saves a hash sum of a password in a document's header where it can be easily accessed and removed by the specialized software. Password to open a document offers much tougher protection that had been steadily enhanced in the subsequent editions of Microsoft Office.

Word 95 and all the preceding editions had the weakest protection that utilized a conversion of a password to a 16-bit key.

Key length in Word 97 and 2000 was strengthened up to 40 bit. However, modern cracking software allows removing such a password very quickly – a persistent cracking process takes one week at most. Use of rainbow tables reduces password removal time to several seconds. Some password recovery software can not only remove a password but also find an actual password that was used by a user to encrypt the document using the brute-force attack approach. Statistically, the possibility of recovering the password depends on the password strength.

Word's 2003/XP version default protection remained the same but an option that allowed advanced users to choose a Cryptographic Service Provider was added. If a strong CSP is chosen, guaranteed document decryption becomes unavailable and, therefore, a password can't be removed from the document. Nonetheless, a password can be fairly quickly picked with a brute-force attack, because its speed is still high regardless of the CSP selected. Moreover, since the CSPs are not active by default, their use is limited to advanced users only.

Word 2007 offers significantly more secure document protection which utilizes the modern Advanced Encryption Standard (AES) that converts a password to a 128-bit key using a SHA-1 hash function 50,000 times. It makes password removal impossible (as of today, no computer that can pick the key in a reasonable amount of time exists) and drastically slows the brute-force attack speed down to several hundreds of passwords per second.

Word's 2010 protection algorithm was not changed apart from the increasing number of SHA-1 conversions up to 100,000 times and consequently, the brute-force attack speed decreased two times more.

== Versions and platforms ==
=== Word for Windows ===
Microsoft Word for Windows (2007)

Word for Windows is available stand-alone or as part of the Microsoft Office suite. Word contains rudimentary desktop publishing capabilities and is the most widely used word processing program on the market. Word files are commonly used as the format for sending text documents via e-mail because almost every user with a computer can read a Word document by using the Word application, a Word viewer or a word processor that imports the Word format (see Microsoft Word Viewer).

Word 6 for Windows NT was the first 32-bit version of the product, released with Microsoft Office for Windows NT around the same time as Windows 95. It was a straightforward port of Word 6.0. Starting with Word 95, each release of Word was named after the year of its release, instead of its version number.

Word 2007 introduced a redesigned user interface that emphasized the most common controls, dividing them into tabs, and adding specific options depending on the context, such as selecting an image or editing a table. This user interface, called Ribbon, was included in Excel, PowerPoint and Access 2007, and would be later introduced to other Office applications with Office 2010 and Windows applications such as Paint and WordPad with Windows 7, respectively.

The redesigned interface also includes a toolbar that appears when selecting text, with options for formatting included.

Word 2007 also included the option to save documents as Adobe Acrobat or XPS files, and upload Word documents like blog posts on services such as WordPress.

Word 2010 allows the customization of the Ribbon, adds a Backstage view for file management, has improved document navigation, allows creation and embedding of screenshots, and integrates with online services such as Microsoft OneDrive.

Word 2019 added a dictation function.

Word 2021 added co-authoring, a visual refresh on the start experience and tabs, automatic cloud saving, dark mode, line focus, an updated draw tab, and support for ODF 1.3.

Microsoft Word 2024 (Fourth perpetual release of Office 16) for the Microsoft Windows and MacOS was released on October 1, 2024.

=== Word for Mac ===
Word for Mac running on macOS Ventura (13.2)

The Mac was introduced on January 24, 1984, and Microsoft introduced Word 1.0 for Mac a year later, on January 18, 1985. The DOS, Mac, and Windows versions are quite different from each other. Only the Mac version was WYSIWYG and used a graphical user interface, far ahead of the other platforms. Each platform restarted its version numbering at "1.0". There was no version 2 on the Mac, but version 3 came out on January 31, 1987, as described above. Word 4.0 came out on November 6, 1990, and added automatic linking with Excel, the ability to flow text around graphics, and a WYSIWYG page view editing mode. Word 5.1 for Mac, released in 1992 ran on the original 68000 CPU and was the last to be specifically designed as a Macintosh application. The later Word 6 was a Windows port and poorly received. Word 5.1 continued to run well until the last classic Mac OS. Many people continue to run Word 5.1 to this day under an emulated Mac classic system for some of its excellent features, such as document generation and renumbering, or to access their old files.

Microsoft Word 2011 running on OS X

In 1997, Microsoft formed the Macintosh Business Unit as an independent group within Microsoft focused on writing software for the classic Mac OS. Its first version of Word, Word 98, was released with Office 98 Macintosh Edition. Document compatibility reached parity with Word 97, and it included features from Word 97 for Windows, including spell and grammar checking with squiggles. Users could choose the menus and keyboard shortcuts to be similar to either Word 97 for Windows or Word 5 for Mac.

Word 2001, released in 2000, added a few new features, including the Office Clipboard, which allowed users to copy and paste multiple items. It was the last version to run on the classic Mac OS and, on Mac OS X, it could only run within the Classic Environment. Word X, released in 2001, was the first version to run natively on, and to require, Mac OS X, and introduced non-contiguous text selection.

Word 2004 was released in May 2004. It included a new Notebook Layout view for taking notes either by typing or by voice. Other features, such as tracking changes, were made more similar to Office for Windows.

Word 2008, released on January 15, 2008, included a Ribbon-like feature, called the Elements Gallery, that can be used to select page layouts and insert custom diagrams and images. It also included a new view focused on publishing layout, integrated bibliography management, and native support for the new Office Open XML format. It was the first version to run natively on Intel-based Macs.

Word 2011, released in October 2010, replaced the Elements Gallery in favor of a Ribbon user interface that is much more similar to Office for Windows, and includes a full-screen mode that allows users to focus on reading and writing documents, and support for Office Web Apps.

Microsoft Office 2016 for Mac (2015)

Microsoft Office 2019 for Mac (2018)

Word 2021 added real-time co-authoring, automatic cloud saving, dark mode, immersive reader enhancements, line focus, a visual refresh, the ability to save pictures in SVG format, and a new Sketched style outline.

Word 2024, released on September 16, 2024, included Word session recovery, support for ODF 1.4, new theme and color palette and ability for easier collaboration. Even though collaboration features were also available in Microsoft Word 2021 as part of post release update, they were not available in Word LTSC 2021 or Word LTSC 2024.

=== Write for Atari ST ===
Microsoft Word on Atari ST was titled Microsoft Write.

Microsoft Write for the Atari ST is the Atari version of Microsoft Word 1.05 released for the Apple Macintosh while sharing the same name as the Microsoft Write program included in Windows during the 80s and early 90s. While the program was announced in 1986, various delays caused the program to arrive in 1988. Microsoft Write for Atari ST and Microsoft Word for Windows would both make their debut at the 1988 COMDEX in Atlanta, Georgia alongside their respective booths.

Like the Mac version, the Atari version features WYSIWYG form (via GDOS) and used a graphical user interface (via GEM).

Microsoft Write was one of the first Atari word processors that utilizes the GDOS (Graphics Device Operating System) part of GEM (Graphics Environment Manager) allowing the word processor to display and print graphic fonts & styles making it a multifont word processor for the Atari ST (a 2nd disk drive was required to run both Microsoft Write and GDOS). Microsoft Write was packaged with GDOS 1.1 and the drivers for the Atari XMM804 dot matrix printer along with 3rd party printers like Epson FX-80 and Star Micronics NB-15 on 4 diskettes (3½ inch format).

Accompanying the retail packaging was a 206-page slip-cased user's manual that was divided into 3 sections: Learning Write, Using Write and Write Reference. In addition, Microsoft Write also featured a "Help Screen" tool to help a user explore the advanced features of the word processor that earned high praise for its form and presentation.

=== Write for Macintosh ===
In October 1987, Microsoft released Microsoft Write for Macintosh. Write is a version of Microsoft Word with limited features that Microsoft hoped would replace aging MacWrite in the Macintosh word processor market. Write was priced well below Word, though at the time MacWrite was included with new Macintoshes. Write is best described as Word locked in "Short Menus" mode, and as such it used the same file format so that users could exchange files with absolutely no conversion necessary. Write did not sell well and was discontinued before the System 7 era. Microsoft Write was part of a short-lived trend for "lightweight" Macintosh word processors initiated by the introduction of the Macintosh Portable and early PowerBook systems. Others included LetterPerfect and Nisus Compact.

=== Word on mobile platforms ===
Microsoft Pocket Word running on Handheld PC 2000

The first mobile versions of Word were released with Windows CE in 1996 on Handheld PCs and later also on Pocket PCs.

Microsoft 365 version of Microsoft Word running on Android 13

The modern Word Mobile supports basic formatting, such as bolding, changing font size, and changing colors (from red, yellow, or green). It can add comments, but can't edit documents with tracked changes. It can't open password-protected documents; change the typeface, text alignment, or style (normal, heading 1); insert responsive checkboxes; insert pictures; or undo.

Word Mobile is neither able to display nor insert footnotes, endnotes, page footers, page breaks, certain indentation of lists, and certain fonts while working on a document, but retains them if the original document has them. Word Mobile can insert lists, but doesn't allow to set custom bullet symbols and customize list numbering. In addition to the features of the 2013 version, the 2007 version on Windows Mobile also has the ability to save documents in the Rich Text Format and open legacy PSW (Pocket Word). Furthermore, it includes a spell checker, word count tool, and a "Find and Replace" command. In 2015, Word Mobile became available for Windows 10 and Windows 10 Mobile on Windows Store. Support for the Windows 10 Mobile version ended on January 12, 2021.

Word for iOS was released on March 27, 2014 and for Android was released on January 29, 2015.

=== Word for the web ===
Word for the web is a free lightweight version of Microsoft Word available as part of Office on the web, which also includes web versions of Microsoft Excel and Microsoft PowerPoint.

Word for the web lacks some Ribbon tabs, such as Design and Mailings. Mailings allows users to print envelopes and labels and manage mail merge printing of Word documents. Word for the web is not able to edit certain objects, such as: equations, shapes, text boxes or drawings, but a placeholder may be present in the document. Certain advanced features like table sorting or columns will not be displayed but are preserved as they were in the document. Other views available in the Word desktop app (Outline, Draft, Web Layout, and Full-Screen Reading) are not available, nor are side-by-side viewing, split windows, and the ruler.

== Reception ==
Initial releases of Word were met with criticism. Byte in 1984 criticized the documentation for Word 1.1 and 2.0 for DOS, calling it "a complete farce". It called the software "clever, put together well and performs some extraordinary feats", but concluded that "especially when operated with the mouse, has many more limitations than benefits... extremely frustrating to learn and operate efficiently". PC Magazine's review was very mixed, stating: "I've run into weird word processors before, but this is the first time one's nearly knocked me down for the count" but acknowledging that Word's innovations were the first that caused the reviewer to consider abandoning WordStar. While the review cited an excellent WYSIWYG display, sophisticated print formatting, windows, and footnoting as merits, it criticized many small flaws, very slow performance, and "documentation produced by Madame Sadie's Pain Palace". It concluded that Word was "two releases away from potential greatness".

"Whatever Microsoft Word does right, it does better than any other program", Edward Mendelson wrote in summer 1985. "What is frustrating is that it does so many things wrong", he said of version 2.0 in The Yale Review, including mouse dependence, manual pagination, and "some of the most baroque and opaque menus ever devised", recommending WordPerfect and three other DOS programs instead. Jerry Pournelle wrote in October 1987 said that he did not like Word because "the mouse is such an integral part of the program. When I am creating text, I do not want to take my hands off the keyboard". Compute!'s Apple Applications in December 1987 stated that "despite a certain awkwardness", Word 3.01 "will likely become the major Macintosh word processor" with "far too many features to list here". While criticizing the lack of true WYSIWYG, the magazine concluded that "Word is marvelous. It's like a Mozart or Edison, whose occasional gaucherie we excuse because of his great gifts".

Compute! in December 1989 stated that Word 5.0's integration of text and graphics made it "a solid engine for basic desktop publishing". The magazine approved of improvements to text mode, described the $75 price for upgrading from an earlier version as "the deal of the decade" and concluded that "as a high-octane word processor, Word is worth a look". The magazine in December 1993 said that 6.0 for DOS had "many (but not all) of the features of Word for Windows 2.0", and surmised that it was intended to prepare users to migrate to Windows. Compute! recommended it over WordPerfect 6.0 to those needing "maximum speed with minimal hardware" such as an 80286 computer.

Computer Intelligence estimated in 1987 that Microsoft had 4% of the Fortune 1000 PC word processor market. A 1988 PC reader survey found that 11% used Word, third behind WordPerfect and WordStar. A 1990 American Institute of Certified Public Accountants member survey found that 8% used Word, in third place behind WordPerfect and WordStar. Dataquest estimated that Word had 55% of the Windows word processor market in 1991. During the first quarter of 1996, Word accounted for 80% of the worldwide word processor market.

In 2013, Microsoft added Word to the new Office 365 product, where Microsoft has combined their most popular software, which is a cloud based computing software that is subscription-based to compete with Google Docs.

== Release history ==
Unsupported
Supported
Latest version

Microsoft Word 2010 running on Windows 7

Microsoft Word for Windows release history
Year released	Name	Version	Comments
1989	Word for Windows 1.0	1.0	Code-named Opus
1990	Word for Windows 1.1	1.1	For Windows 3.0. Code-named Bill the Cat
1990	Word for Windows 1.1a	1.1a	On March 25, 2014, Microsoft made the source code to Word for Windows 1.1a available to the public via the Computer History Museum.
1991	Word for Windows 2.0	2.0	Included in Office 3.0.
1993	Word for Windows 6.0	6.0	Version numbers 3, 4, and 5 were skipped, to bring Windows version numbering in line with that of DOS, Mac OS, and WordPerfect (the main competing word processor at the time). Also, a 32-bit version for Windows NT only. Included in Office 4.0, 4.2, and 4.3.
1995	Word for Windows 95	7.0	Included in Office 95
1997	Word 97	8.0	Included in Office 97
1998	Word 98	8.5	Included in Office 97
1999	Word 2000	9.0	Included in Office 2000
2001	Word 2002	10.0	Included in Office XP
2003	Office Word 2003	11.0	Included in Office 2003
2006	Office Word 2007	12.0	Included in Office 2007; released to businesses on November 30, 2006, released worldwide to consumers on January 30, 2007. Extended support until October 10, 2017.
2010	Word 2010	14.0	Included in Office 2010; skipped 13.0 due to triskaidekaphobia.
2013	Word 2013	15.0	Included in Office 2013
2016	Word 2016	16.0	Included in Office 2016
2019	Word 2019	16.0	Included in Microsoft Office 2019
2021	Word 2021	16.0	Included in Microsoft Office 2021
2024	Word 2024	16.0	Included in Microsoft Office 2024

Microsoft Word for classic Mac OS and macOS release history
Year released	Name	Version	Comments
1985	Word 1	1.0	
1987	Word 3	3.0	
1989	Word 4	4.0	Part of Office 1.0 and 1.5
1991	Word 5	5.0	Part of Office 3.0; Requires System 6.0.2, 512 KB of RAM (1 MB for 5.1, 2 MB to use spell check and thesaurus), 6.5 MB available hard drive space
1992	Word 5.1	5.1	Part of Office 3.0; Last version to support 68000-based Macs
1993	Word 6	6.0	Part of Office 4.2; Shares code and user interface with Word for Windows 6; Requires System 7.0, 4 MB of RAM (8 MB recommended), at least 10 MB available hard drive space, 68020 CPU
1998	Word 98	8.5	Part of Office 98 Macintosh Edition; Requires PowerPC-based Macintosh; Renumbered alongside contemporary Windows version
2000	Word 2001	9.0	Part of Microsoft Office 2001; Word 2001 is the last version that is compatible with Classic Mac OS (Mac OS 9 or earlier)
2001	Word v. X	10.0	Part of Office v. X; First version for Mac OS X only
2004	Word 2004	11.0	Part of Office 2004
2008	Word 2008	12.0	Part of Office 2008
2010	Word 2011	14.0	Part of Office 2011; skipped 13.0 due to triskaidekaphobia.
2015	Word 2016	16.0	Part of Office 2016; skipped 15.0
2019	Word 2019	17.0	Included in Microsoft Office 2019
2021	Word 2021	17.0	Included in Microsoft Office 2021
2024	Word 2024	17.0	Included in Microsoft Office 2024

Word for MS-DOS release history
Year released	Name	Version	Comments
1983	Word 1	1.0	Initial version of Word
1985	Word 2	2.0	
1986	Word 3	3.0	Removed copy protection
1987	Word 4	4.0	
1989	Word 5	5.0	
1991	Word 5.1	5.1	
1991	Word 5.5	5.5	First DOS version to use a Windows-like user interface
1993	Word 6	6.0	Last DOS version.

Word release history on other platforms
Platform	Year released	Name	Comments
Atari ST	1988	Microsoft Write	Based on Microsoft Word 1.05 for Mac OS
OS/2	1989	Microsoft Word 5.0	Word 5.0 for DOS is a "family mode" application capable of running as a native app on either MS-DOS or 16-bit OS/2.
OS/2	1991	Microsoft Word 5.5	Word 5.5 for DOS is a "family mode" application capable of running as a native app on either MS-DOS or 16-bit OS/2.
OS/2	1990	Microsoft Word for OS/2 Presentation Manager version 1.1	
OS/2	1991	Microsoft Word for OS/2 Presentation Manager version 1.2	
SCO Unix	1990	Microsoft Word for Unix version 5.0	
SCO Unix	1991	Microsoft Word for Unix version 5.1	

== Logo gallery ==
2025–present

2019–2025

2013–2019

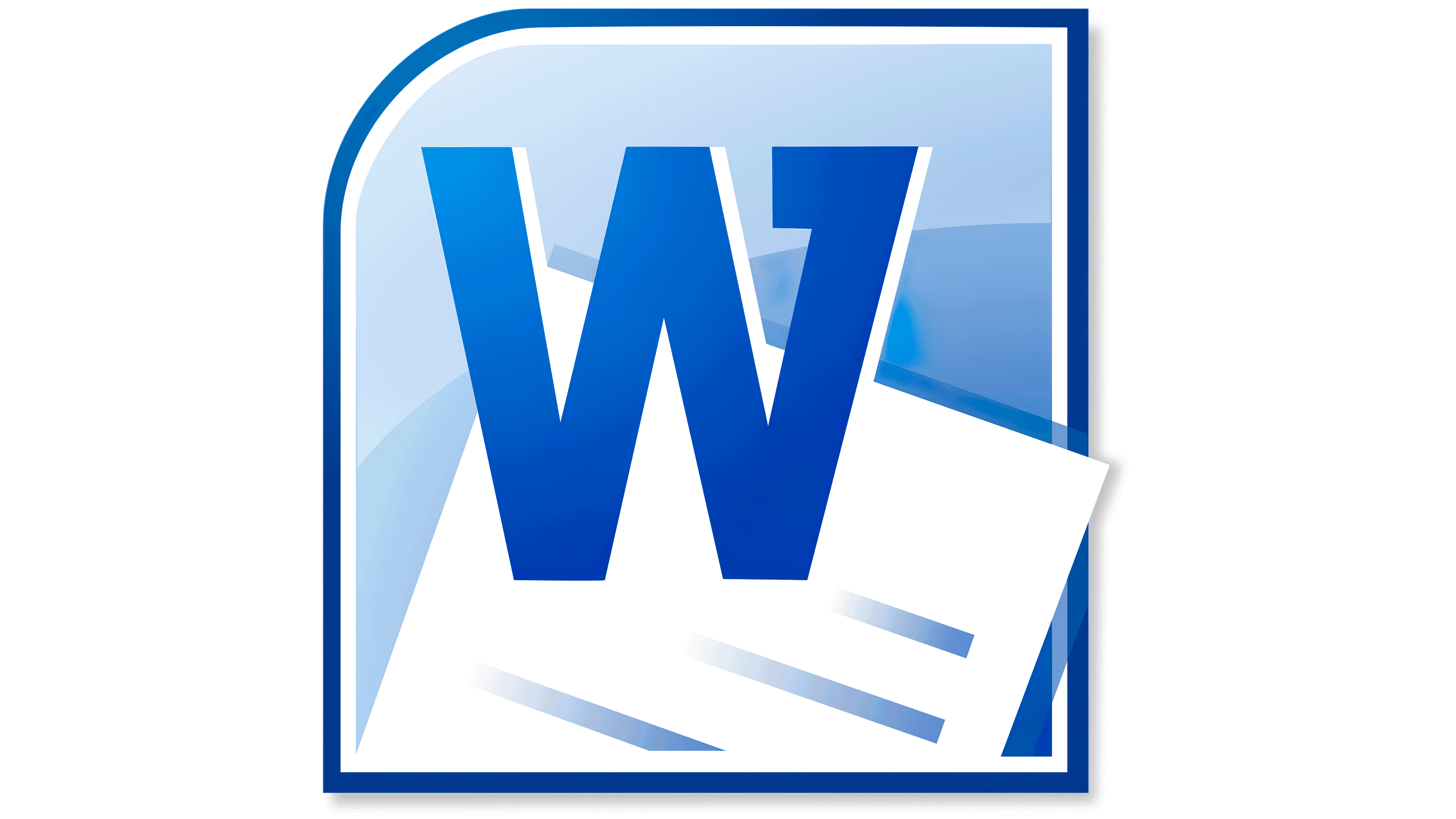
2010–2013

2007–2010

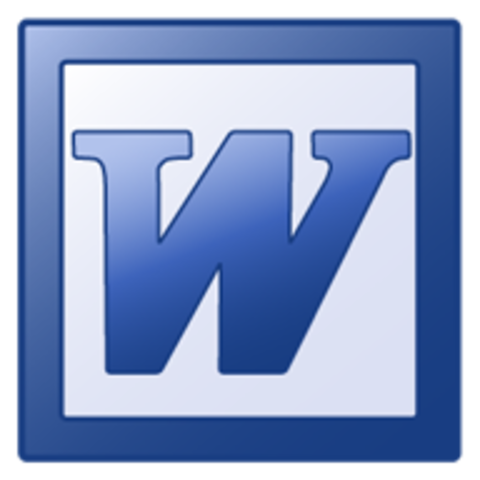
2003–2007

1999–2003

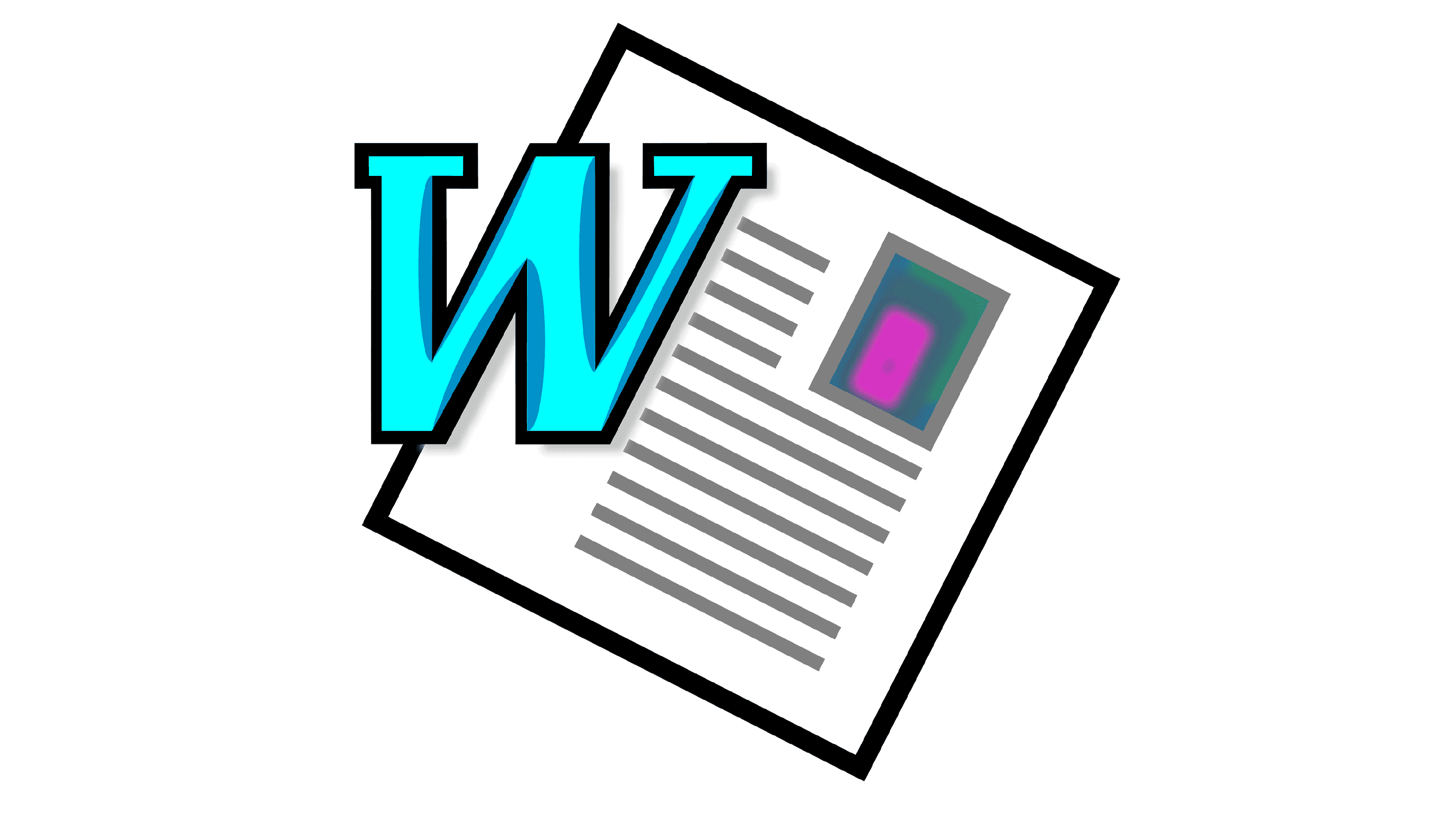
1995–1999

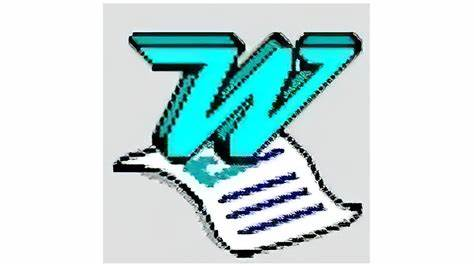
1993–1995

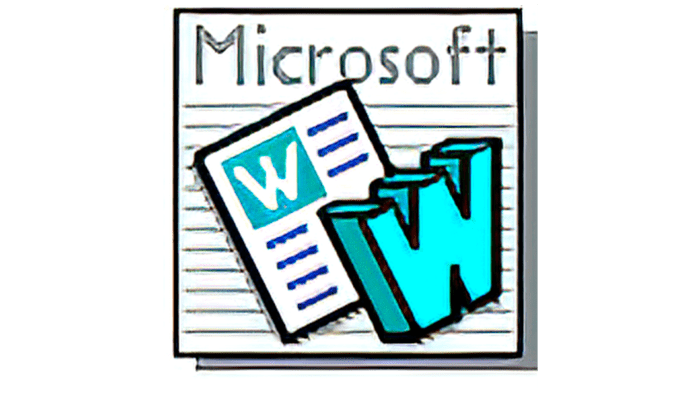
1991–1993

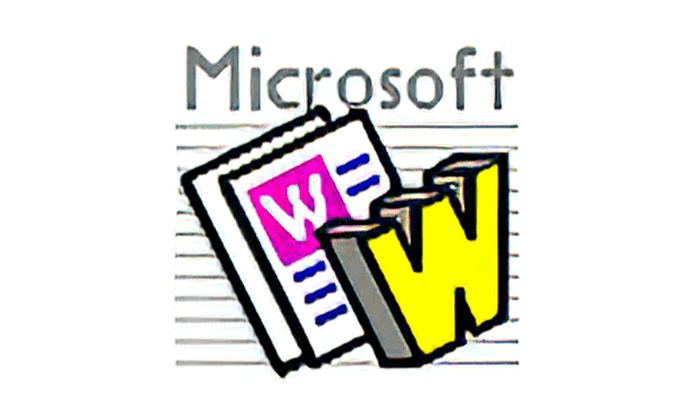
1987–1991
