= Microsoft Office 2004 for Mac =

Office software suite

- Screenshot of Microsoft Word 2004 on an Intel-based Mac in Mac OS X v10.4 "Tiger" through Rosetta
- Developer: Microsoft
- Initial release: May 11, 2004; 22 years ago
- Final release: v11.6.6 / December 13, 2011; 14 years ago
- Predecessor: Microsoft Office v. X
- Successor: Microsoft Office 2008 for Mac
- License: Commercial proprietary software
- Website: microsoft.com/mac/products

System requirements
- CPU: PowerPC G3 or higher
- Operating system: Mac OS X v10.2.8 through v10.6.8
- RAM: 256 MB
- Free hard disk space: 450 MB

Microsoft Office 2004 for Mac is a version of Microsoft Office developed for Mac OS X. It is equivalent to Office 2003 for Windows. The software was originally written for PowerPC Macs, so Macs with Intel CPUs must run the program under Mac OS X's Rosetta emulation layer. For this reason, it is not compatible with Mac OS X 10.7 and newer.

Office 2004 was replaced by its successor, Microsoft Office 2008 for Mac, which was developed as a universal binary to run natively on Intel Macs. However, Office 2008 did not include support for Visual Basic for Applications, which made Microsoft extend the support period of Office 2004 from October 13, 2009, to January 10, 2012. Microsoft ultimately shipped support for Visual Basic in Microsoft Office 2011 for Mac, which also dropped PowerPC support altogether. Support for Office 2004 ended January 10, 2012.

== Editions ==
Microsoft Office for Mac 2004 is available in three editions: Standard, Professional, and Student and Teacher. All three editions include Word, Excel, PowerPoint and Entourage. The Professional Edition includes Virtual PC. The Student and Teacher Edition is not eligible for upgrade, which means if a later version of Office is installed, a full package license will be required.

== Features ==
=== Word 2004 ===
Microsoft Word is a word processor which possesses a dominant market share in the word processor market. Its proprietary DOC format is considered a de facto standard, although its successive Windows version (Word 2007) uses a new XML-based format called .DOCX, but has the capability of saving and opening the old .DOC format.

The new Office Open XML format was built into the next version of Office for Mac (Office 2008). However, it is also supported on Office 2004 with the help of a free conversion tool available from Microsoft.

=== Excel 2004 ===
Microsoft Excel is a spreadsheet program. Like Microsoft Word, it possesses a dominant market share. It was originally a competitor to the dominant Lotus 1-2-3, but it eventually outsold it and became the de facto standard for spreadsheet programs.

=== Entourage 2004 ===
Microsoft Entourage is an email application. Its personal information management features include a calendar, address book, task list, note list, and project manager. With Entourage 2004, Microsoft began offering a Project Center, which allows the user to create and organize projects. Information may come from within Entourage or outside the program.

=== PowerPoint 2004 ===
Microsoft PowerPoint is a popular presentation program used to create slideshows composed of text, graphics, movies and other objects, which can be displayed on-screen and navigated through by the presenter or printed out on transparencies or slides. It too possesses a dominant market share. Movies, videos, sounds and music, as well as wordart and autoshapes can be added to slideshows.

=== Virtual PC ===
Included with Office 2004 for Mac Professional Edition, Microsoft Virtual PC is a hypervisor which emulates Microsoft Windows operating systems on Mac OS X which are PowerPC-based. Virtual PC does not work on Intel-based Macs and in August 2006, Microsoft announced it would not be ported to Intel-based Macintoshes, effectively discontinuing the product.

== Limitations ==
Office for Mac 2004 has a number of limitations compared to Office 2003 for Windows.

Images inserted into any Office 2004 application by using either cut and paste or drag and drop result in a file that does not display the inserted graphic when viewed on a Windows machine. Instead, the Windows user is told "QuickTime and a TIFF (LZW) decompressor are needed to see this picture". Peter Clark of Geek Boy's Blog presented one solution in December 2004. However, this issue persists in Office 2008.

There is no support for editing right to left and bidirectional languages (such as Arabic, Hebrew, Persian, etc.) in Office 2004. This issue has not been fixed in Office 2008 or 2011 either.

Also, Office for Mac 2004 has a shorter lifecycle than Office 2003. Support for Office for Mac 2004 ended on January 10, 2012. As PowerPC software, it will not run on OS X Lion or later versions of macOS without the legacy Rosetta compatibility layer.

== See also ==
- List of office suites
- Comparison of office suites
