= Microsoft Office 2021 =

Version of the Microsoft Office productivity suite

- A screenshot of the Office 2021 LTSC ProPlus suite. Clockwise from top left: Word, Excel, Outlook and PowerPoint
- Developer: Microsoft
- Release: October 5, 2021; 5 years ago

Stable release(s) [±]
- Retail: 2609 (Build 20430.20182) / October 13, 2026; 28 days ago
- Volume licensed: 2108 (Build 14334.20974) / October 13, 2026; 28 days ago
- Operating system: Windows 10 v1809 or later; Windows Server 2019 or later
- Platform: IA-32, x64, ARM64
- Included with: Microsoft 365
- Predecessor: Microsoft Office 2019 (2018)
- Successor: Microsoft Office 2024 (2024)
- Available in: 104 languages
- List of languages: Full (40): English, Arabic, Bulgarian, Chinese (Simplified), Chinese (Traditional), Croatian, Czech, Danish, Dutch, Estonian, Finnish, French, German, Greek, Hebrew, Hindi, Hungarian, Indonesian, Italian, Japanese, Kazakh, Korean, Latvian, Lithuanian, Malay (Latin), Norwegian Bokmål, Polish, Portuguese (Brazil), Portuguese (Portugal), Romanian, Russian, Serbian (Latin, Serbia), Slovak, Slovenian, Spanish (Latin America), Spanish (Spain), Swedish, Thai, Turkish, Ukrainian, Vietnamese; Partial (51): Afrikaans, Albanian, Amharic, Armenian, Assamese, Azerbaijani (Latin), Bangla (Bangladesh), Bangla (Bengali India), Basque (Basque), Belarusian, Bosnian (Latin), Catalan, Dari, Filipino, Galician, Georgian, Gujarati, Icelandic, Irish, Kannada, Khmer, KiSwahili, Konkani, Kyrgyz, Luxembourgish, Macedonian (Republic of Macedonia), Malayalam, Maltese, Maori, Marathi, Mongolian (Cyrillic), Nepali, Norwegian Nynorsk, Odia, Persian (Farsi), Punjabi (Gurmukhi), Quechua, Scottish Gaelic, Serbian (Cyrillic, Bosnia & Herzegovina), Serbian (Cyrillic, Serbia), Sindhi (Arabic), Sinhala, Tamil, Tatar (Cyrillic), Telugu, Turkmen (Latin), Urdu, Uyghur, Uzbek (Latin), Valencian, Welsh; Proofing only (11): Hausa, Igbo, isiXhosa, isiZulu, Kinyarwanda, Pashto, Romansh, Sesotho sa Leboa, Setswana, Wolof, Yoruba, Zulu
- Type: Office suite
- License: Trialware
- Website: office.com

Microsoft Office 2021 for Mac
- Developer: Microsoft
- Release: October 5, 2021; 5 years ago
- Stable release: 16.114.4 (26110224) (November 4, 2026; 6 days ago) [±]
- Operating system: macOS Catalina or later
- Platform: x64, ARM64
- Predecessor: Microsoft Office 2019 for Mac (2018)
- Successor: Microsoft Office 2024 for Mac (2024)
- Available in: 27 languages
- List of languages English, Arabic, Chinese (Simplified), Chinese (Traditional), Czech, Danish, Dutch, Finnish, French, German, Greek, Hebrew, Hungarian, Indonesian, Italian, Japanese, Korean, Norwegian (Bokmål), Polish, Portuguese (Portugal), Portuguese (Brazil), Russian, Slovak, Spanish, Swedish, Thai, Turkish

Microsoft Office 2021 (third release codenamed Office 16) is a version of the Microsoft Office suite of applications for the Microsoft Windows and macOS operating systems. It was released on October 5, 2021. Office 2021 is compatible with Windows 10 v1809 and Windows Server 2019 through Windows 11 v24H2 and Windows Server 2025. It is also compatible with macOS Catalina through macOS Sequoia. Its successor, Microsoft Office 2024 was released on October 1, 2024.

Office 2021 retains the same major version number of 16 that previous versions of Office had. It introduces new dynamic arrays, XLOOKUP features for Excel, full dark-mode support in Windows and performance improvements. Support for retail versions of Office 2021 ended on October 13, 2026; unlike older versions of Office, there is no extended support period.

== Development ==
The office suite updates include better support for the OASIS OpenDocument file format. The version update adds features to the LET function, has better search for XMATCH function, dynamic arrays, XLOOKUP. It enhances Ink for Translate in Microsoft Outlook and PowerPoint.

== Editions ==
=== Office 2021 ===
- Home & Student: Home & Student includes the core applications: Word, Excel, PowerPoint, and OneNote. This edition can be installed either on PC or on Mac.
- Home & Business: Home & Business includes the core applications and Outlook. This edition can be installed either on PC or on Mac.
- Professional: Professional includes the core applications, as well as Outlook, Publisher, and Access. This edition is exclusive for PC only.
- Professional Plus: Professional Plus includes the core applications, as well as Outlook, Publisher, Access, and Teams (replacement of previous Skype for Business). This edition is exclusive for PC only.

Application(s)	Home & Student	Home & Business	Professional	Professional Plus
Core applications	Yes	Yes	Yes	Yes
Outlook	No	Yes	Yes	Yes
Publisher	No	No	Yes	Yes
Access	No	No	Yes	Yes
Teams	No	No	No	Yes

Office 2021 supports installation by using a product key to associate with a Microsoft Account (MSA), then by activation.

=== Office LTSC 2021 ===
Volume licensing perpetual branch of Microsoft Office, 3 editions were released:

- Standard for Mac: Standard for Mac includes the core applications as well as Outlook. It is only available for Apple Macintosh computers.
- Standard: Standard includes the core applications, as well as Outlook and Publisher. It is only available for Microsoft Windows PCs.
- Professional Plus: Professional Plus includes the core applications, as well as Outlook, Publisher, Access, and Teams. It is only available for Microsoft Windows PCs.

Application(s)	Standard for Mac	Standard	Professional Plus
Core applications	Yes	Yes	Yes
Outlook	Yes	Yes	Yes
Publisher	No	Yes	Yes
Access	No	No	Yes
Teams	No	No	Yes

== Default font change ==
Midway through the life cycle of Office 2021, after two years of evaluating five newly commissioned fonts in July – the default font across all Office applications was changed to Aptos. This marked the first time since 16 years that Microsoft had changed the default fonts.

== User interface ==
The default interface, when the Office theme set to Use system setting, dark gray, black, or white, shows a Mica background (whence the name) across the top of each screen; the application icon is in the top left corner. When Colorful is selected (must be done manually), a band in the application color shows across the top of each screen; this is called the Metro background.

== Version history (Windows) ==
=== Retail ===
Release date	Version number
October 5, 2021	2108 (Build 16.0.14326.20454)
October 6, 2021	2109 (Build 14430.20270)
October 12, 2021	2109 (Build 14430.20298)
October 14, 2021	2109 (Build 14430.20306)
October 25, 2021	2110 (Build 14527.20226)
October 28, 2021	2110 (Build 14527.20234)
November 9, 2021	2110 (Build 14527.20276)
November 30, 2021	2110 (Build 14527.20312)
December 3, 2021	2111 (Build 14701.20226)
December 14, 2021	2111 (Build 14701.20248)
December 16, 2021	2111 (Build 14701.20262)
January 4, 2022	2112 (Build 14729.20194)
January 11, 2022	2112 (Build 14729.20248)
January 12, 2022	2112 (Build 14729.20260)
January 26, 2022	2201 (Build 14827.20158)
February 8, 2022	2201 (Build 14827.20192)
February 16, 2022	2201 (Build 14827.20198)
February 28, 2022	2202 (Build 14931.20120)
March 8, 2022	2202 (Build 14931.20132)
March 30, 2022	2203 (Build 15028.20160)
April 12, 2022	2203 (Build 15028.20204)
April 20, 2022	2203 (Build 15028.20228)
April 26, 2022	2204 (Build 15128.20178)
May 10, 2022	2204 (Build 15128.20224)
May 17, 2022	2204 (Build 15128.20248)
May 24, 2022	2205 (Build 15225.20204)
June 14, 2022	2205 (Build 15225.20288)
June 29, 2022	2206 (Build 15330.20196)
July 6, 2022	2206 (Build 15330.20230)
July 12, 2022	2206 (Build 15330.20246)
July 18, 2022	2206 (Build 15330.20264)
August 3, 2022	2207 (Build 15427.20194)
August 9, 2022	2207 (Build 15427.20210)
August 31, 2022	2208 (Build 15601.20088)
September 13, 2022	2208 (Build 15601.20148)
September 26, 2022	2209 (Build 15629.20156)
October 11, 2022	2209 (Build 15629.20208)
October 27, 2022	2210 (Build 15726.20174)
November 8, 2022	2210 (Build 15726.20202)
December 6, 2022	2211 (Build 15831.20190)
December 13, 2022	2211 (Build 15831.20208)
January 10, 2023	2212 (Build 15928.20216)
January 26, 2023	2301 (Build 16026.20146)
February 28, 2023	2302 (Build 16130.20218)
March 14, 2023	2302 (Build 16130.20306)
March 20, 2023	2302 (Build 16130.20332)
March 28, 2023	2303 (Build 16227.20212)
April 4, 2023	2303 (Build 16227.20258)
April 11, 2023	2303 (Build 16227.20280)
April 25, 2023	2304 (Build 16327.20214)
May 9, 2023	2304 (Build 16327.20248)
June 1, 2023	2305 (Build 16501.20196)
June 13, 2023	2305 (Build 16501.20210)
June 26, 2023	2306 (Build 16529.20154)
July 11, 2023	2306 (Build 16529.20182)
July 26, 2023	2307 (Build 16626.20132)
July 27, 2023	2307 (Build 16626.20134)
August 8, 2023	2303 (Build 16227.20280)
August 28, 2023	2308 (Build 16731.20170)
September 12, 2023	2308 (Build 16731.20234)
September 28, 2023	2309 (Build 16827.20130)
October 10, 2023	2309 (Build 16827.20166)
October 25, 2023	2310 (Build 16924.20106)
October 31, 2023	2310 (Build 16924.20124)
November 14, 2023	2310 (Build 16924.20150)
November 29, 2023	2311 (Build 17029.20068)
December 12, 2023	2311 (Build 17029.20108)
January 4, 2024	2312 (Build 17126.20126)
January 9, 2024	2312 (Build 17126.20132)
January 30, 2024	2401 (Build 17231.20182)
February 1, 2024	2401 (Build 17231.20194)
February 13, 2024	2401 (Build 17231.20236)
February 28, 2024	2402 (Build 17328.20142)
March 4, 2024	2402 (Build 17328.20162)
March 12, 2024	2402 (Build 17328.20184)
March 27, 2024	2403 (Build 17425.20138)
March 29, 2024	2403 (Build 17425.20146)
April 9, 2024	2403 (Build 17425.20176)
April 29, 2024	2404 (Build 17531.20120)
May 1, 2024	2404 (Build 17531.20128)
May 7, 2024	2404 (Build 17531.20140)
May 14, 2024	2404 (Build 17531.20152)
May 30, 2024	2405 (Build 17628.20110)
June 11, 2024	2405 (Build 17628.20144)
June 19, 2024	2405 (Build 17628.20164)
June 26, 2024	2406 (Build 17726.20126)
July 9, 2024	2406 (Build 17726.20160)
August 1, 2024	2407 (Build 17830.20138)
August 13, 2024	2407 (Build 17830.20166)
August 26, 2024	2408 (Build 17928.20114)
September 10, 2024	2408 (Build 17928.20156)
September 23, 2024	2409 (Build 18025.20096)
September 25, 2024	2409 (Build 18025.20104)
October 8, 2024	2409 (Build 18025.20140)
October 15, 2024	2409 (Build 18025.20160)
October 28, 2024	2410 (Build 18129.20116)
November 12, 2024	2410 (Build 18129.20158)
December 5, 2024	2411 (Build 18227.20152)
December 10, 2024	2411 (Build 18227.20162)
January 7, 2025	2412 (Build 18324.20168)
January 14, 2025	2412 (Build 18324.20190)
January 16, 2025	2412 (Build 18324.20194)
January 30, 2025	2501 (Build 18429.20132)
February 11, 2025	2501 (Build 18429.20158)
March 5, 2025	2502 (Build 18526.20144)
March 11, 2025	2502 (Build 18526.20168)
April 2, 2025	2503 (Build 18623.20156)
April 8, 2025	2503 (Build 18623.20178)
April 17, 2025	2503 (Build 18623.20208)
April 29, 2025	2504 (Build 18730.20122)
May 6, 2025	2504 (Build 18730.20142)
May 13, 2025	2504 (Build 18730.20168)
May 20, 2025	2504 (Build 18730.20186)
May 29, 2025	2505 (Build 18827.20128)
June 3, 2025	2505 (Build 18827.20140)
June 10, 2025	2505 (Build 18827.20150)
June 17, 2025	2505 (Build 18827.20164)
June 26, 2025	2505 (Build 18827.20176)
July 1, 2025	2506 (Build 18925.20138)
July 8, 2025	2506 (Build 18925.20158)
July 15, 2025	2506 (Build 18925.20168)
July 22, 2025	2506 (Build 18925.20184)
July 30, 2025	2507 (Build 19029.20136)
August 5, 2025	2507 (Build 19029.20156)
August 12, 2025	2507 (Build 19029.20184)
August 19, 2025	2507 (Build 19029.20208)
August 26, 2025	2508 (Build 19127.20154)
September 3, 2025	2508 (Build 19127.20192)
September 9, 2025	2508 (Build 19127.20222)
September 16, 2025	2508 (Build 19127.20240)
September 23, 2025	2508 (Build 19127.20264)
October 1, 2025	2509 (Build 19231.20156)
October 7, 2025	2509 (Build 19231.20172)
October 14, 2025	2509 (Build 19231.20194)
October 21, 2025	2509 (Build 19231.20216)
October 30, 2025	2510 (Build 19328.20158)
November 4, 2025	2510 (Build 19328.20178)
November 11, 2025	2510 (Build 19328.20190)
November 18, 2025	2510 (Build 19328.20232)
December 3, 2025	2511 (Build 19426.20170)
December 9, 2025	2511 (Build 19426.20186)
December 16, 2025	2511 (Build 19426.20218)
January 8, 2026	2512 (Build 19530.20138)
January 13, 2026	2512 (Build 19530.20144)
January 21, 2026	2512 (Build 19530.20184)
January 27, 2026	2601 (Build 19628.20150)
February 3, 2026	2601 (Build 19628.20166)
February 10, 2026	2601 (Build 19628.20204)
February 17, 2026	2601 (Build 19628.20214)
February 24, 2026	2602 (Build 19725.20126)
March 3, 2026	2602 (Build 19725.20152)
March 10, 2026	2602 (Build 19725.20172)
March 18, 2026	2602 (Build 19725.20190)
March 24, 2026	2603 (Build 19822.20114)
March 31, 2026	2603 (Build 19822.20142)
April 9, 2026	2603 (Build 19822.20168)
April 14, 2026	2603 (Build 19822.20182)
April 21, 2026	2604 (Build 19929.20090)
April 29, 2026	2604 (Build 19929.20106)
May 12, 2026	2604 (Build 19929.20164)
May 14, 2026	2604 (Build 19929.20172)
May 20, 2026	2605 (Build 20026.20076)
May 26, 2026	2605 (Build 20026.20112)
June 2, 2026	2605 (Build 20026.20140)
June 9, 2026	2605 (Build 20026.20168)
June 16, 2026	2605 (Build 20026.20182)
June 25, 2026	2606 (Build 20131.20090)
June 30, 2026	2606 (Build 20131.20112)
July 7, 2026	2606 (Build 20131.20126)
July 14, 2026	2606 (Build 20131.20154)
July 23, 2026	2607 (Build 20228.20110)
July 29, 2026	2607 (Build 20228.20124)
August 4, 2026	2607 (Build 20228.20158)
August 11, 2026	2607 (Build 20228.20190)
August 18, 2026	2608 (Build 20326.20100)
August 26, 2026	2608 (Build 20326.20112)
September 1, 2026	2608 (Build 20326.20132)
September 8, 2026	2608 (Build 20326.20144)
September 18, 2026	2608 (Build 20326.20158)
September 22, 2026	2609 (Build 20430.20092)
September 30, 2026	2609 (Build 20430.20118)
October 6, 2026	2609 (Build 20430.20146)
October 13, 2026	2609 (Build 20430.20182)
November 10, 2026	2610 (Build 20527.20196)

=== Volume licensed ===
Release date	Version number
October 12, 2021	2108 (Build 14332.20145)
November 9, 2021	2108 (Build 14332.20176)
December 14, 2021	2108 (Build 14332.20204)
January 11, 2022	2108 (Build 14332.20216)
February 8, 2022	2108 (Build 14332.20238)
March 8, 2022	2108 (Build 14332.20255)
April 12, 2022	2108 (Build 14332.20281)
May 10, 2022	2108 (Build 14332.20303)
June 14, 2022	2108 (Build 14332.20324)
July 12, 2022	2108 (Build 14332.20345)
August 9, 2022	2108 (Build 14332.20358)
September 13, 2022	2108 (Build 14332.20375)
October 11, 2022	2108 (Build 14332.20400)
November 8, 2022	2108 (Build 14332.20416)
December 13, 2022	2108 (Build 14332.20435)
January 10, 2023	2108 (Build 14332.20447)
February 14, 2023	2108 (Build 14332.20461)
March 14, 2023	2108 (Build 14332.20481)
April 11, 2023	2108 (Build 14332.20493)
May 9, 2023	2108 (Build 14332.20503)
June 13, 2023	2108 (Build 14332.20517)
July 11, 2023	2108 (Build 14332.20529)
July 27, 2023	2108 (Build 14332.20542)
August 8, 2023	2108 (Build 14332.20546)
September 12, 2023	2108 (Build 14332.20565)
October 10, 2023	2108 (Build 14332.20582)
November 14, 2023	2108 (Build 14332.20604)
December 12, 2023	2108 (Build 14332.20615)
January 9, 2024	2108 (Build 14332.20624)
February 13, 2024	2108 (Build 14332.20637)
March 12, 2024	2108 (Build 14332.20651)
April 9, 2024	2108 (Build 14332.20685)
May 14, 2024	2108 (Build 14332.20706)
June 11, 2024	2108 (Build 14332.20721)
July 9, 2024	2108 (Build 14332.20736)
August 13, 2024	2108 (Build 14332.20763)
September 10, 2024	2108 (Build 14332.20771)
October 8, 2024	2108 (Build 14332.20791)
November 12, 2024	2108 (Build 14332.20812)
December 10, 2024	2108 (Build 14332.20828)
January 14, 2025	2108 (Build 14332.20839)
February 11, 2025	2108 (Build 14332.20857)
March 11, 2025	2108 (Build 14332.21007)
April 8, 2025	2108 (Build 14332.21017)
May 13, 2025	2108 (Build 14332.21040)
June 10, 2025	2108 (Build 14334.20090)
June 24, 2025	2108 (Build 14334.20116)
July 8, 2025	2108 (Build 14334.20136)
August 12, 2025	2108 (Build 14334.20244)
September 9, 2025	2108 (Build 14334.20296)
October 14, 2025	2108 (Build 14334.20344)
November 11, 2025	2108 (Build 14334.20402)
December 4, 2025	2108 (Build 14334.20440)
January 13, 2026	2108 (Build 14334.20468)
February 10, 2026	2108 (Build 14334.20522)
March 10, 2026	2108 (Build 14334.20570)
April 14, 2026	2108 (Build 14334.20624)
May 12, 2026	2108 (Build 14334.20670)
May 14, 2026	2108 (Build 14334.20688)
June 9, 2026	2108 (Build 14334.20756)
July 14, 2026	2108 (Build 14334.20806)
August 11, 2026	2108 (Build 14334.20848)
September 8, 2026	2108 (Build 14334.20906)
September 12, 2026	2108 (Build 14334.20914)
September 16, 2026	2108 (Build 14334.20918)
October 13, 2026	2108 (Build 14334.20974)
November 10, 2026	2108 (Build 14334.21048)
