= Crome =

Crome may refer to:

== People ==
- August Friedrich Wilhelm Crome (1753–1833), German economist
- Georg Ernst Wilhelm Crome (1781–1813), German agricultural scientist; see Franz Körte
- John Crome (1768–1821), English painter and founder of the Norwich School of painters
- John Berney Crome (1794–1842), English painter
- Louise Crome, New Zealand squash player

== Other ==
- Crome, former name of Chrome, California, a community in Glenn County

== See also ==
- Chrome (disambiguation)
