= Microsoft Chrome =

Former set of application programming interfaces for DirectX

Microsoft's Chrome was the code name for a set of APIs that allowed DirectX to be easily accessed from user-space software, including HTML. Launched with some fanfare in early 1998, Chrome, and the related Chromeffects, was re-positioned several times before being canceled only a few months later in a corporate reorganization. Throughout its brief lifespan, the product was widely derided as an example of Microsoft's embrace, extend and extinguish strategy of ruining standards efforts by adding options that only ran on their platforms.

== History ==
In May 1997, Microsoft bought pioneering startup Dimension X, developers of several Java-based animation tools including Liquid Motion and Liquid Reality. Looking to make their recently introduced Direct3D more widely available, the Chrome project combined the Dimension X team with many members of the original D3D team. Chrome was originally positioned as a way to easily add 3D effects to all sorts of programs, and described as a "Windows system service" that would be finalized in early 1999. Chrome was the services level of the package, consisting of drivers that talked to D3D, along with a simple viewer application.

Chromeffects was an XML-based wrapper that allowed Chrome to be called from within a web page. Embedding Chromeffects objects in HTML pages could produce rich content in the same way that VML does for 2D artwork. Chrome's project manager, Bob Heddle, claimed that "It is going to propel the industry. We're moving DirectX from programmers to artists." Likewise, Microsoft Liquid Motion was a layer similar to Chromeffects but within Java.

Chromeffects did not support any of the media standards that were being developed at the W3C coincident with its development, including HTML+TIME or the document object model. This led to widespread outcry from the internet community, who saw Chrome as an attempt by Microsoft to inject a powerful proprietary technology into the open standards based web. If uptake of Chromeffects was widespread, this would limit users to Microsoft platforms where the content could be viewed. This led to promises on the part of MS to better interact with these technologies in the future.

Chrome was previewed in July 1998 at that year's SIGGRAPH, with a developer's release following in August. At the time, Chrome demanded relatively hefty machines to run on, a 350 MHz Pentium II or better with an AGP graphics card. Even Microsoft admitted the hardware requirements were steep, according to Brad Chase, Vice President of Windows marketing and developer relations at Microsoft, "The initial PCs that will run the Chrome feature of Windows 98 are going to be 350MHz Pentium boxes. You're not going to be able to have this on a standard Pentium today." However, Microsoft claimed that this standard would be widely met by new machines; the general manager of multimedia at Microsoft, Eric Engstrom, noted "Over next 12 months, our projections show that 55 to 60 million units capable of running Chromeffects will be shipped." In spite of these promises, feedback from the testers was almost universally negative, complaining about poor performance and general bugginess.

In September 1998, Steve Ballmer announced Chromeffects during his keynote speech at Seybold '98. He announced that Chromeffects had been released to hardware manufacturer partners and that they were integrating it with the Windows operating system that they are now shipping on new machines.

Given the almost universal negative press, both from its own developers and the wider community, Microsoft announced that "Based on developer feedback, we are stepping back and redesigning Chromeffects technologies to better meet both our partner and customer needs." Chrome's cancellation was part of a larger reorganization that resulted in dramatic shakeups within Microsoft's multimedia groups. Many of the Chrome staff were merged back into the DirectX team, while Eric Engstrom was moved out of multimedia to the MSN team. Engstrom was in charge of Chrome and the equally "troubled" NetShow streaming media projects. At the time there was also speculation that Chrome was killed in order to avoid further troubles at their ongoing antitrust case, given the outcry from the web community.

Microsoft did deliver on their promise to better track internet standards, releasing Microsoft Vizact which was based on HTML+TIME. Vizact saw little uptake and was discontinued in 2000.

== See also ==
- Adobe Atmosphere, a similar technology
