= Chromeffects =

Microsoft announced Chromeffects as an add-on for Windows 98 to play 3D graphics and video through a web browser or in separate player software, for ads with flashing text and other animation, or to generate user interface enhancements for Web-based applications.

Chromeffects promised to deliver complex multimedia over low-bandwidth connections. Using HTML, XML, C++, VBScript, and Jscript, developers would turn a web browser into a rippling, 3D space with audio and video playback. Later versions of Chromeffects were planned to have the ability to be used for representing databases in 3D.

A MacWeek article from August 1998 quoted David Card, an analyst at Jupiter Communications as saying, "Chromeffects is cool software, and it's not often I say Microsoft has cool software. Apple doesn't have anything comparable".

Chromeffects had problems with its business model, it was not intended to be a freely distributed technology, rather OEM PC manufacturers or other commercial entities would license the technology to provide to their customers as an IE add-on. However, despite a hard marketing push in mid-1998, OEM interests never materialized and Microsoft canceled the project as part of a major internal reorganization in November 1998. The different components of Chromeffects were separated and integrated into other Microsoft products, such as DirectAnimation in Internet Explorer.

The Microsoft Liquid Motion technology used Chromeffects "under the hood".

A similar newer modern initiative by Microsoft is Silverlight.
