= Boulevard des Italiens =

Boulevard in Paris, France

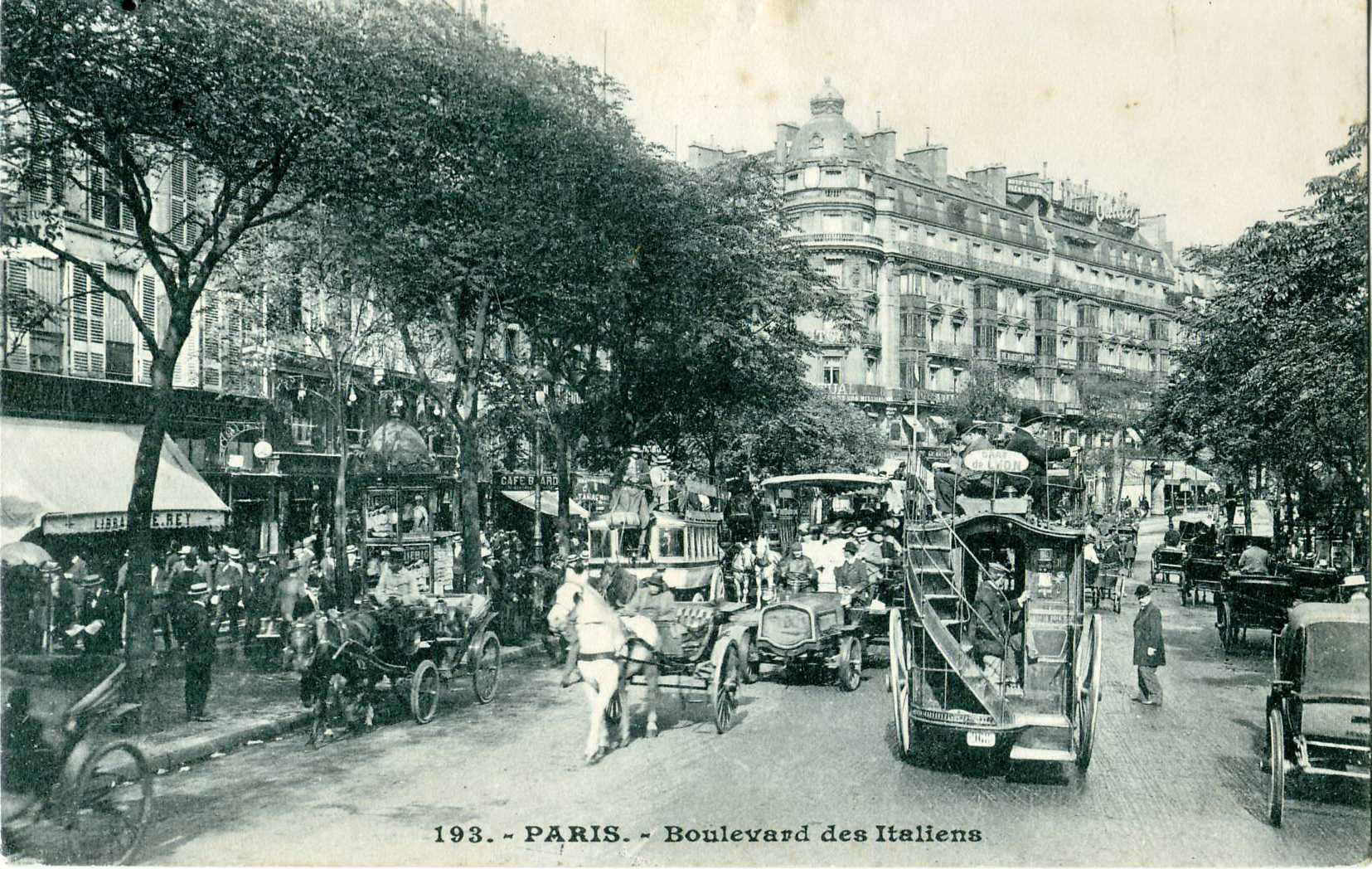
- Boulevard des Italiens at the start of the 20th century

- Location within Paris
- Arrondissement: 2nd, 9th
- Coordinates: 48°52′17.11″N 2°20′13.19″E
- From: Boulevard Montmartre
- To: Boulevard des Capucines

The Boulevard des Italiens (French pronunciation: [bulvaʁ dez‿italjɛ̃]) is a boulevard in Paris. It is one of the 'Grands Boulevards' in Paris, a chain of boulevards built through the former course of the Wall of Charles V and the Louis XIII Wall, which were destroyed by the orders of Louis XIV. The origin of the name is the théâtre des Italiens built on it in 1783, shortly before the French Revolution on the site now occupied by the third Salle Favart.

| Located near the Metro stations: Opéra and Richelieu - Drouot. |

== History ==
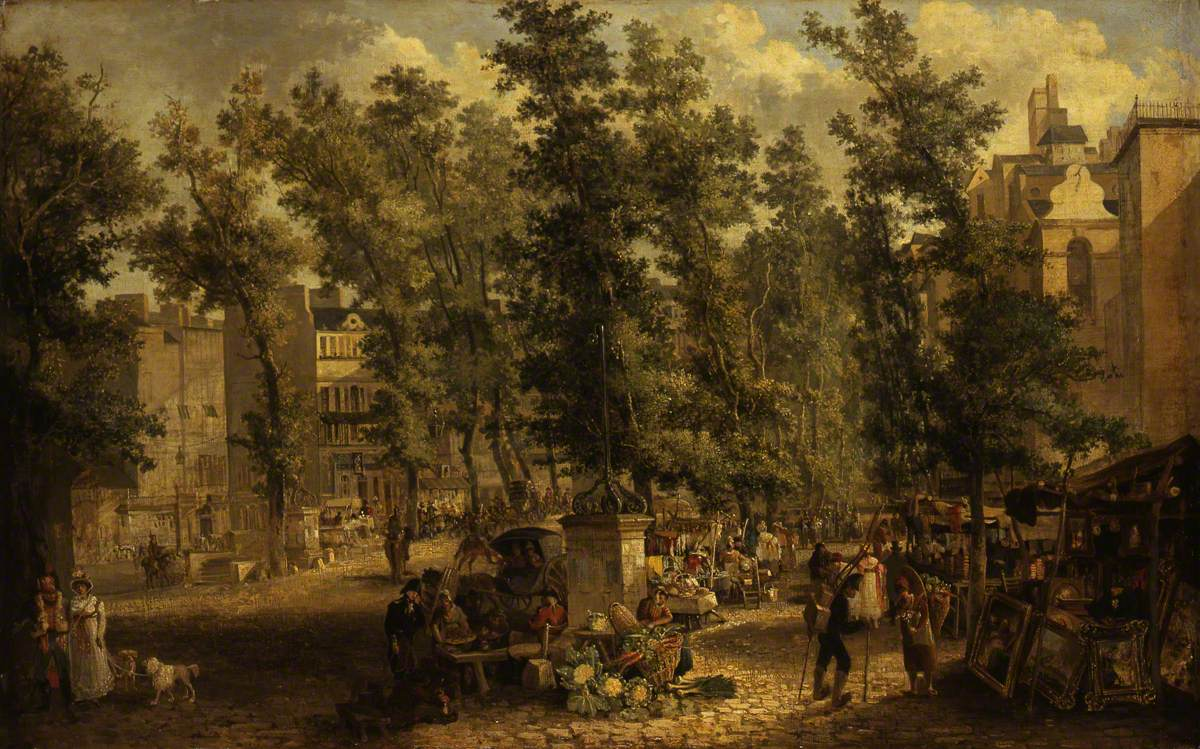
Boulevard des Italiens, Paris by John Crome, 1815

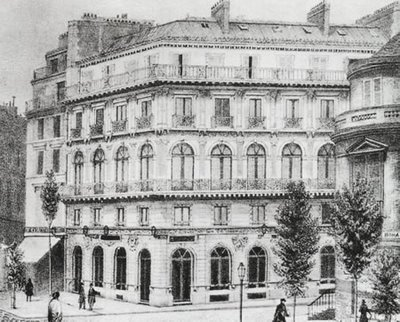
The Maison dorée, with the Café Tortoni on the left and the Café Riche on the right (c. 1900s)

The boulevard's former names were:

- boulevard Neuf ("New boulevard")
- boulevard du Dépôt (boulevard of the barrack), because of a barrack installed in 1764 on the corner of rue de la Chaussée-d'Antin
- boulevard de la Chaussée-d'Antin
- boulevard Cerutti with the name of a hôtel on the boulevard (during the French Revolution)
- le petit Coblence ("little Koblenz") after 1795, since many émigrés returning to France during the French Directory gathered on it (Koblenz had been a popular exile destination for them)
- boulevard de Gand, on one side of the boulevard, under the second Bourbon Restoration, from 1815 to 1828 in memory of Louis XVIII's exile in Ghent during the Hundred Days.

Throughout the 19th century the boulevard was a meeting place for the elegant elite of Paris (a role that lasted until the First World War).

It was to replace Muscadins and Merveilleuses at the time of the Directoire, Gandins at the Restauration, Dandies during the reign of Louis-Philippe 1st, women in crinolines during the Second Empire.

That time was also a major epoque for several famous Cafés: Café de Paris, Café Tortoni (the Café Tortoni in Buenos Aires is named after the Parisian establishment), Café Frascati, Café Français, Maison dorée among others. Upon completion of boulevard Haussmann in the 1920s these establishments disappeared to be replaced by other buildings, particularly financial ones.

== Notable places ==
At the junction with rue Laffitte, a nice view of the Sacré-Coeur de Montmartre, which seems to be placed on the top of the Church Notre-Dame-de-Lorette, whereas it is actually more distant.

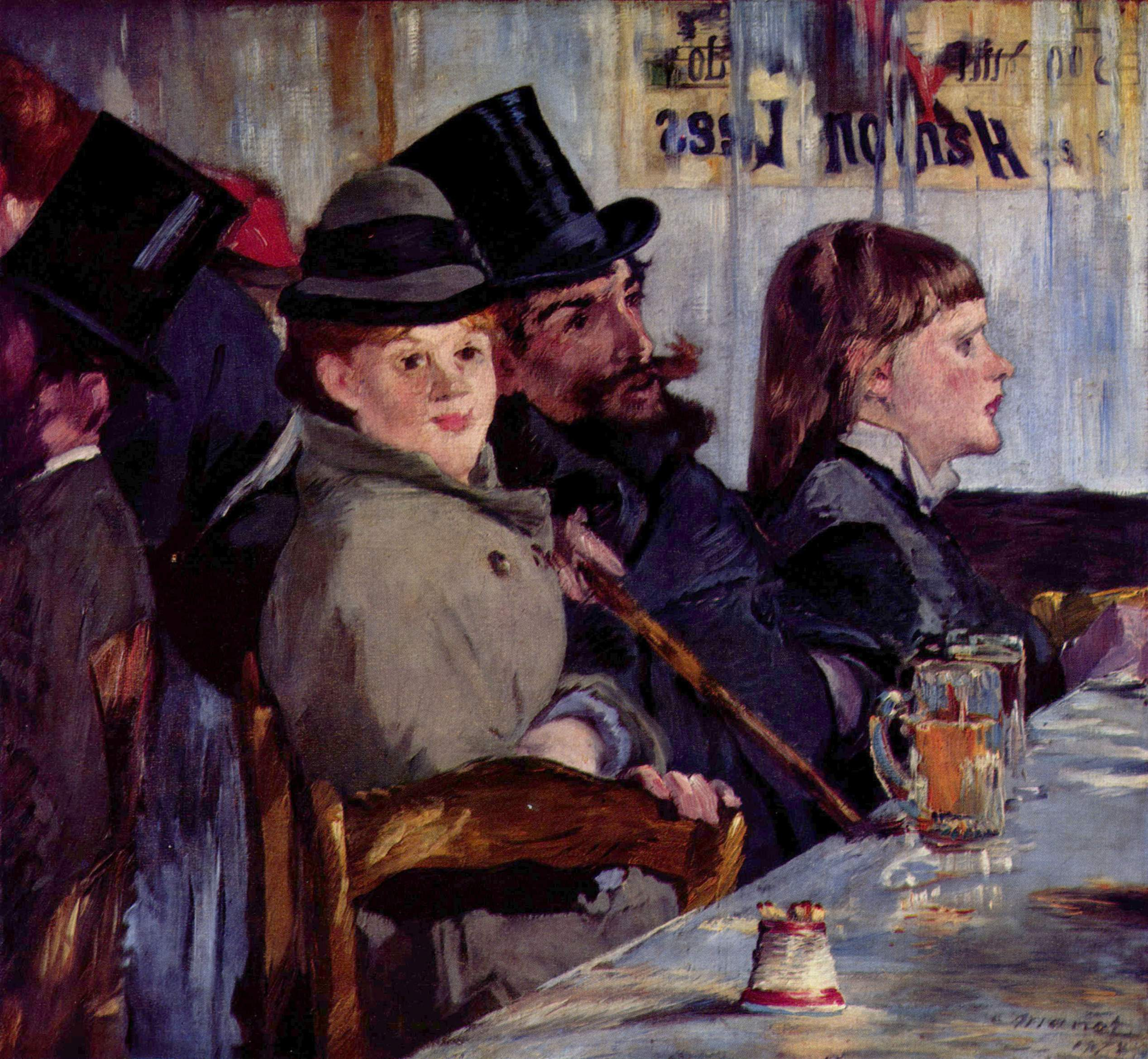
Café: Cabaret von Reichshoffen by Édouard Manet, 1878

- at n° 8, the Théâtre Robert-Houdin, founded by the magician Jean Eugène Robert-Houdin and, in 1888, purchased and directed by Georges Méliès.
- At n° 13, the site of the former Café Anglais (1802-1913), well known restaurant of the Second Empire, replaced by a building in the Art Nouveau style.
- At n° 16, the site of the former Café Riche (1791).
- At n° 19, Crédit Lyonnais headquarters, built from 1876 to 1913 in the Haussmann style.
- At n° 20, the site of the former luxury restaurant La Maison dorée (the Golden House) (1839-1841). Now the headquarters of the bank BNP Paribas, designed by Joseph Marrast, which retained the original facade (example of facadism).
- At n° 22, the site of the former Café Tortoni.
- At n° 26, the site of the former Café de Bade.
- At n° 36, a building created in 1929 by Michel Roux-Spitz. The ground floor was used as showroom for vehicles by the Ford Motor Company. Now, it is a fast food restaurant.

At the corner of rue de la Chaussée d'Antin was the Dépôt des Gardes-françaises (French Guards' barracks) built by the colonel Duke of Biron in 1764. It gave the name of the boulevard for some years. On 12 July 1789, a platoon of the guards saved his colonel, Duchâtelet, from popular riots.

At the corner of rue Louis-le-Grand, Palais Berlitz, built in the style of the 1930s in place of the Pavillon de Hanovre of the 18th century, which was disassembled and rebuilt in the park of Sceaux.

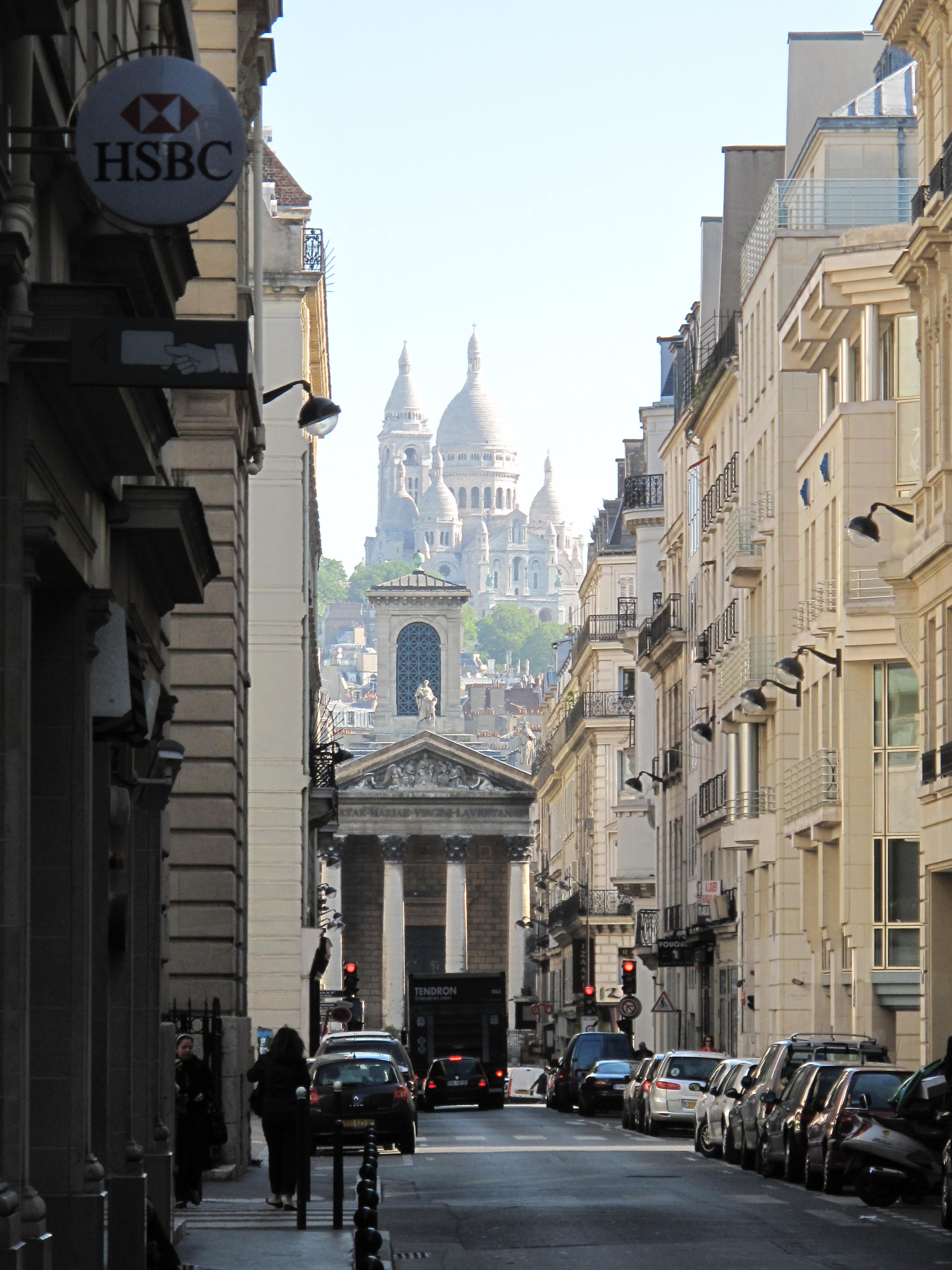
View of the rue Laffitte

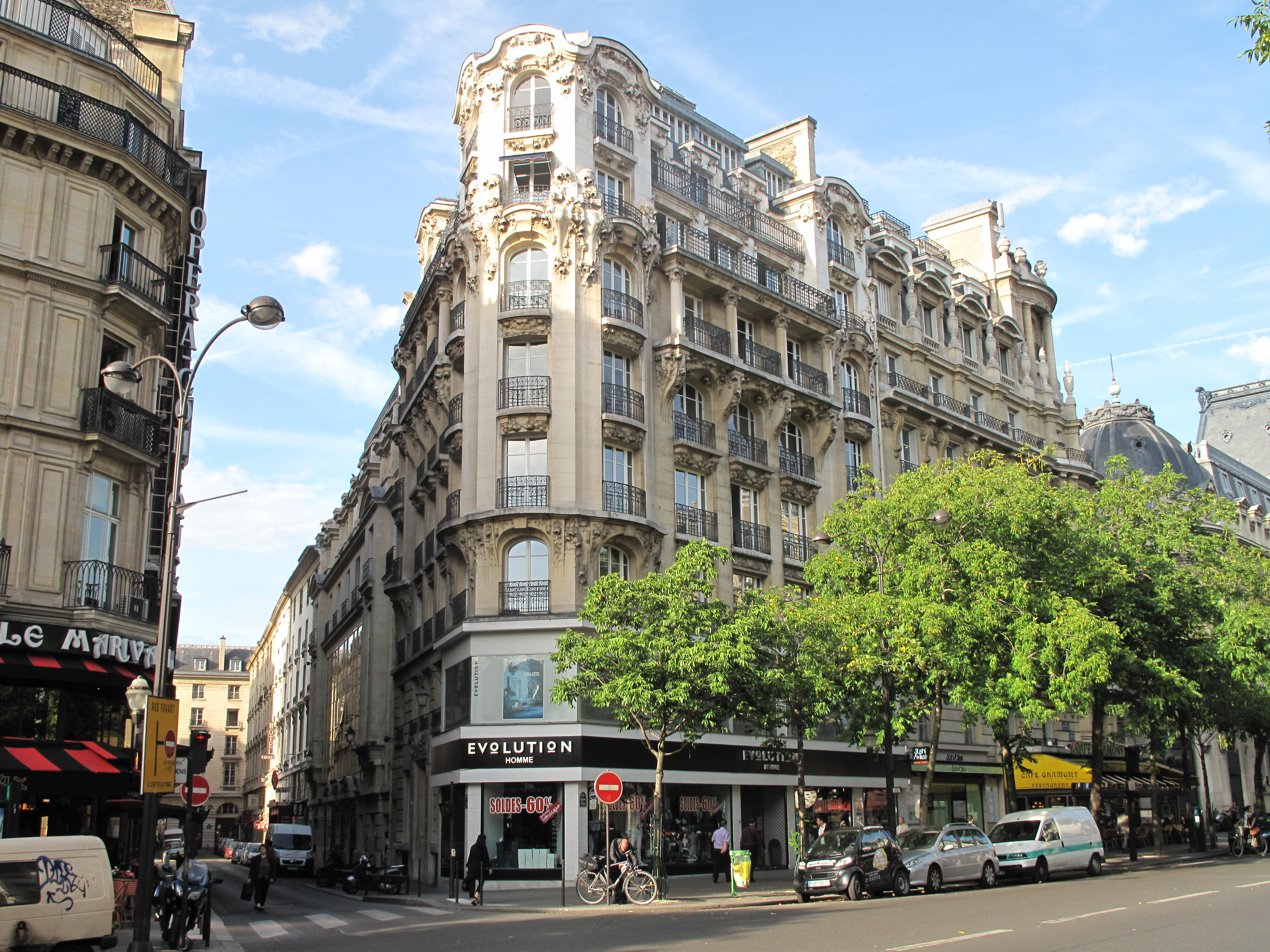
The place of the Café Anglais

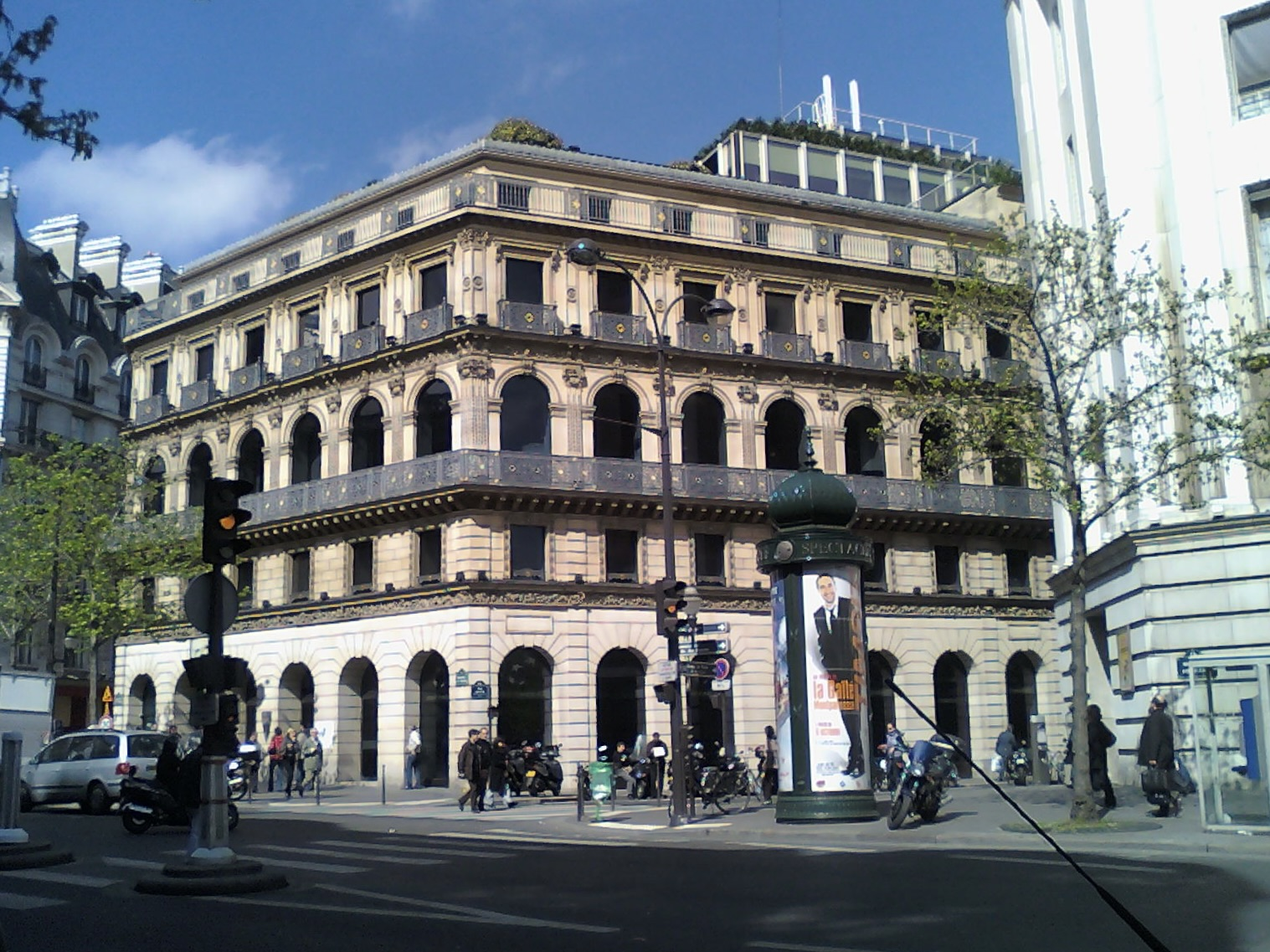
BNP Paribas' head offices, with the facade of the former restaurant "la Maison Dorée"

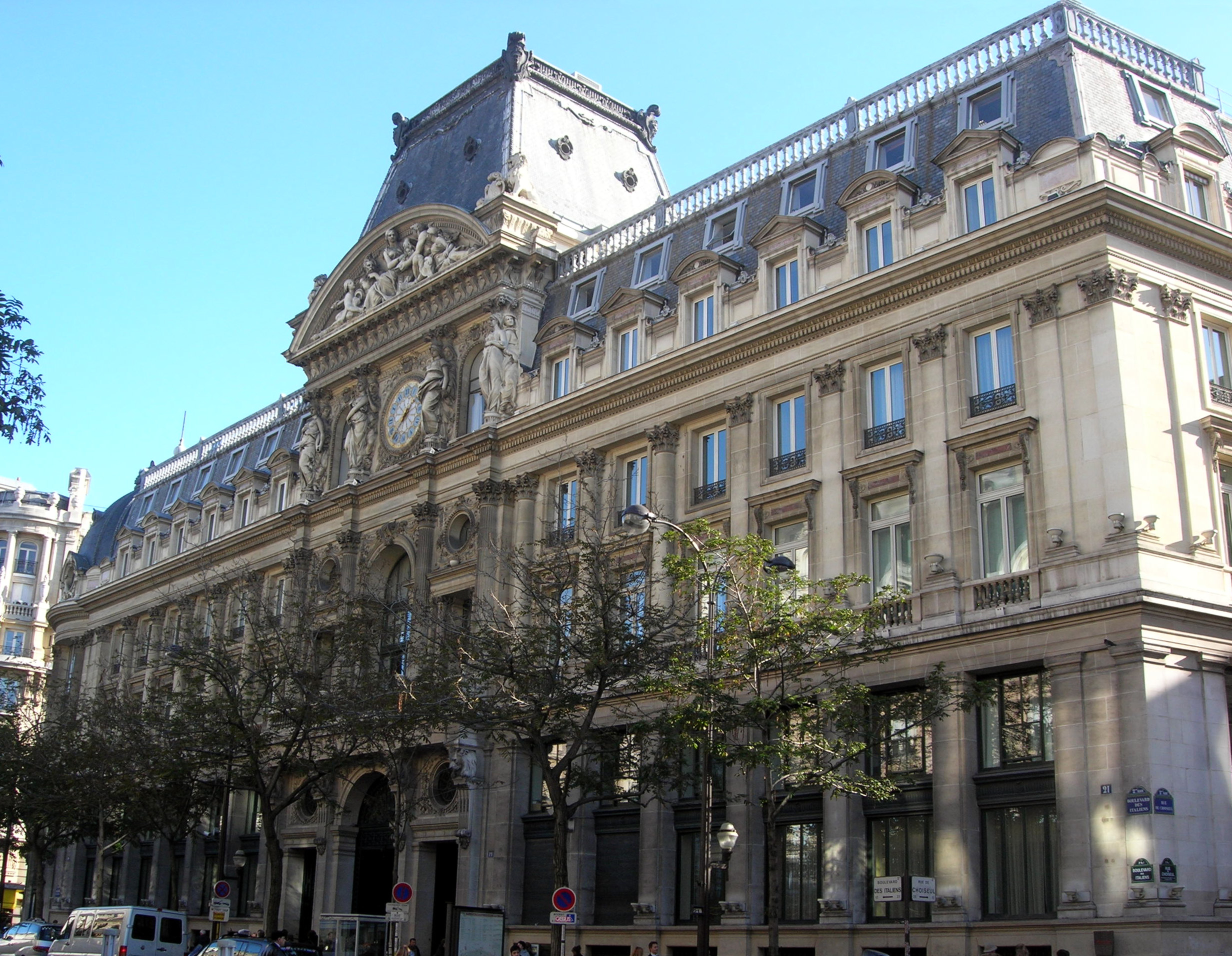
Crédit Lyonnais' head offices

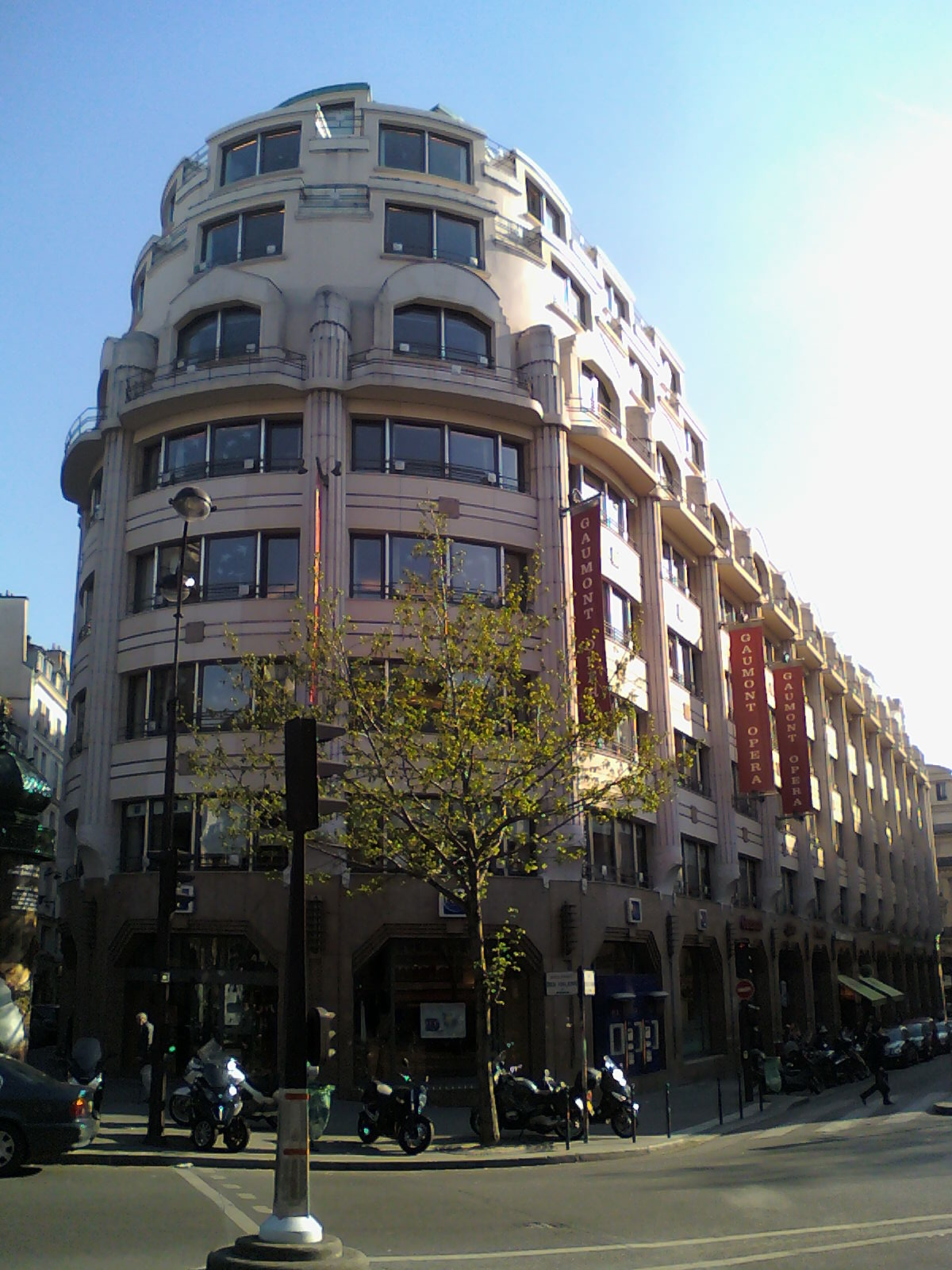
The Palais Berlitz
