= Chrome =

Chrome may refer to:

== Materials ==
- Chromium, a hard, shiny metal, when used in the context of
- Chrome plating, a process of surfacing with chromium
- Chrome alum, a chemical used in mordanting and photographic film

== Computing ==
- Google Chrome, a web browser developed by Google
  - ChromeOS, a Google Chrome- and Linux-based operating system
- User interface chrome, the borders and widgets that frame the content part of a window
  - Chrome (Mozilla) or XUL, the Mozilla XML user interface language
- Chrome (programming language) or Oxygene, an Object Pascal implementation for the .NET Framework
- Microsoft Chrome, an API for DirectX
- S3 Chrome, a series of graphics accelerators

== Gaming ==
- Chrome Engine, a game engine developed by Techland
  - Chrome (video game), a 2003 sci-fi first-person shooter by Techland

== Literature ==
- Chrome (comics) or Allen Marc Yuricic, a Marvel Comics male mutant character
- Jenny Swensen or Chrome, a Marvel Comics female paranormal character
- Chrome, a character in "Burning Chrome" by William Gibson
- Chrome, a gay-themed science fiction novel by George Nader
- Chrome (Dr. Stone), a character in the manga series Dr. Stone

== Music ==
=== Albums ===
- Chrome (Catherine Wheel album) (1993)
- Chrome (The Screaming Jets album) (2016)
- Chrome (Trace Adkins album) (2001)

=== Songs ===
- "Chrome" (Debbie Harry song) (1981)
- "Chrome" (Trace Adkins song) (2002)
- "Chrome", a song by Katatonia from Last Fair Deal Gone Down
- "Chrome", a song by VNV Nation from Matter + Form

=== Performers ===
- Cheetah Chrome (born 1955), American musician
- Chrome (band), an American rock band, from San Francisco in the 1970s
- Chrome (singer), British singer

== Places ==
- Chrome, California, an unincorporated community
- Chrome, New Jersey, an unincorporated community

== Other uses ==
- Chrome Industries, a manufacturer of cycling bags, apparel, and footwear

== See also ==
- Chrome Dokuro, a female character in Reborn!
- Chromeffects, a 3D graphics and video add-on for Windows 98
- Chromite, a mineral ore from which chromium is produced
- Chromium, a chemical element
- Chromium (disambiguation)
- Chromium (web browser), the open source counterpart to Google Chrome
  - ChromiumOS, the open source counterpart to Google ChromeOS
  - Google Chrome Frame, an Internet Explorer plug-in based on Chromium
- Ferrochrome, an alloy of chrome and iron, most commonly used in stainless steel production
