= Yarmouth Water Frolic =

Painting by John Crome

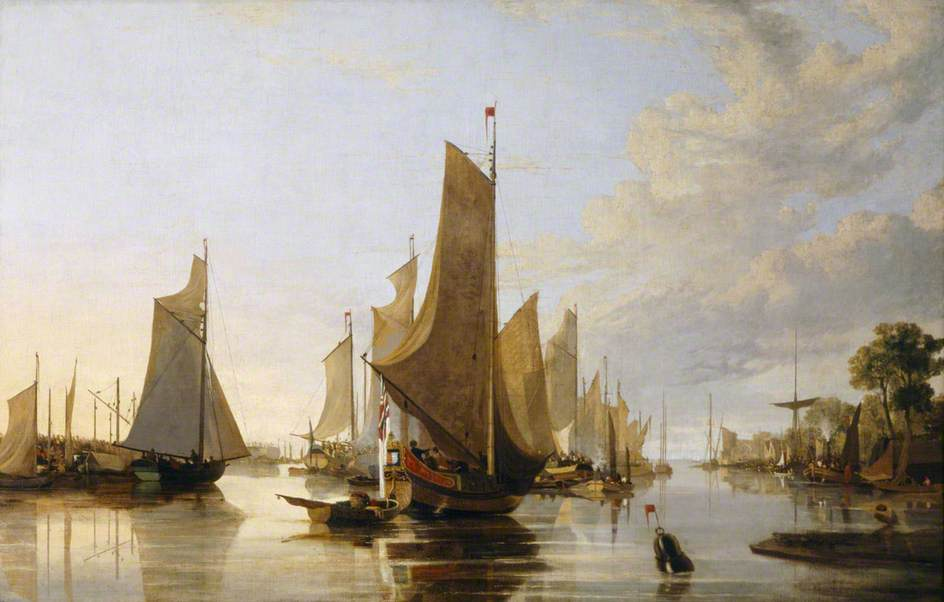
- Artist: John Crome
- Year: 1821
- Type: Oil on canvas, landscape painting
- Dimensions: 106 cm × 172.1 cm (42 in × 67.8 in)
- Location: Kenwood House, London

Yarmouth Water Frolic is an oil on canvas landscape painting by the English artist John Crome, from 1821.

== History and description ==
A riverscape, it depicts a regatta held on the River Yare near Great Yarmouth. Crome was an influential figure in the Norwich school of painters. As he died the same year it was possibly assisted or completed by his son John Berney Crome. It featured at the 1821 Exhibition of the Norwich Society. It is also known by the longer title Yarmouth Water Frolic – Evening; Boats Assembling Previous to the Rowing Match.

It depicts a traditional custom in which the Mayor of Norwich and Mayor of Great Yarmouth met on their stage barges and then were accompanied by other vessels on the river. These were popular, social events in Norfolk drawing thousands of spectators. Today the painting is in the collection of Kenwood House in London having been part of the large Iveagh Bequest by Edward Guinness, 1st Earl of Iveagh in 1929.

== Bibliography ==
- Brown, David Blayney, Hemingway, Andrew & Lyles, Anne. Romantic Landscapes: The Norwich School of Painters. Harry N. Abrams, 2000.
- Bryant, Julius. Kenwood, Paintings in the Iveagh Bequest. Yale University Press, 2003.
- Hawcroft, Francis C. John Crome 1768-1821. Arts Council, 1968.
- Isham, Howard F. Image of the Sea: Oceanic Consciousness in the Romantic Century. Peter Lang, 2004.
