= Maison dorée (Paris) =

Restaurant in Paris

Coordinates: 48°52′18.61″N 2°20′12.85″E

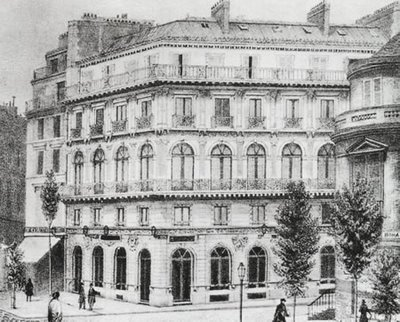
The Maison dorée, with the café Tortoni on the left and the café Riche on the right (c. 1900)

The Maison Dorée (the "Gilded House") was a famous restaurant located at 20 Boulevard des Italiens, Paris.

== Beginnings ==
The Maison Dorée story begins with the former hôtel particulier on this site of Mme de Ferrières, known to the Comte de Stainville-Choiseul, where later Madame Tallien lived. She was known as "Our Lady of Thermidor," the most famous of the Merveilleuses, a group of eccentric and madly fashionable women at the time of the French Directory (1795–99).

The story continues with the Café Hardy, famous during Napoleon's Empire, which was established at the junction of the Boulevard de Gand (now Boulevard des Italiens) and the rue Cerutti (now rue Laffitte). At the Café Hardy, according to the gastronome Grimod de La Reynière, "you could eat the best chops in Paris, and omelettes stuffed with truffles ... that would give appetite to a dying guy. "

It was the most expensive restaurant in Paris, heralded by contemporary newspapers: "You have to be rich to dine at Hardy and bold to dine at Riche" ("hardy" means "bold" in French; Café Riche was on the other side of the rue Laffitte).

The property was sold at a very high price in 1836 to the Hamel brothers, who already owned the café de Chartres, famous as Le Grand Véfour, at the Palais-Royal. The structure was largely rebuilt in 1839.

== Maison Dorée ==
The famous restaurant of "La Maison Dorée", the building built in 1839 by Victor Lemaire, architect-entrepreneur, opened in 1841 was based by Louis Verdier, then managed by his sons Ernest and Charles. Initially, the restaurant was called "Restaurant of the Cité," but because of its luxurious design, with paintings and mirrors, and gilding on the balconies and balustrades, the public named it "Maison Dorée, the "Gilded House"."

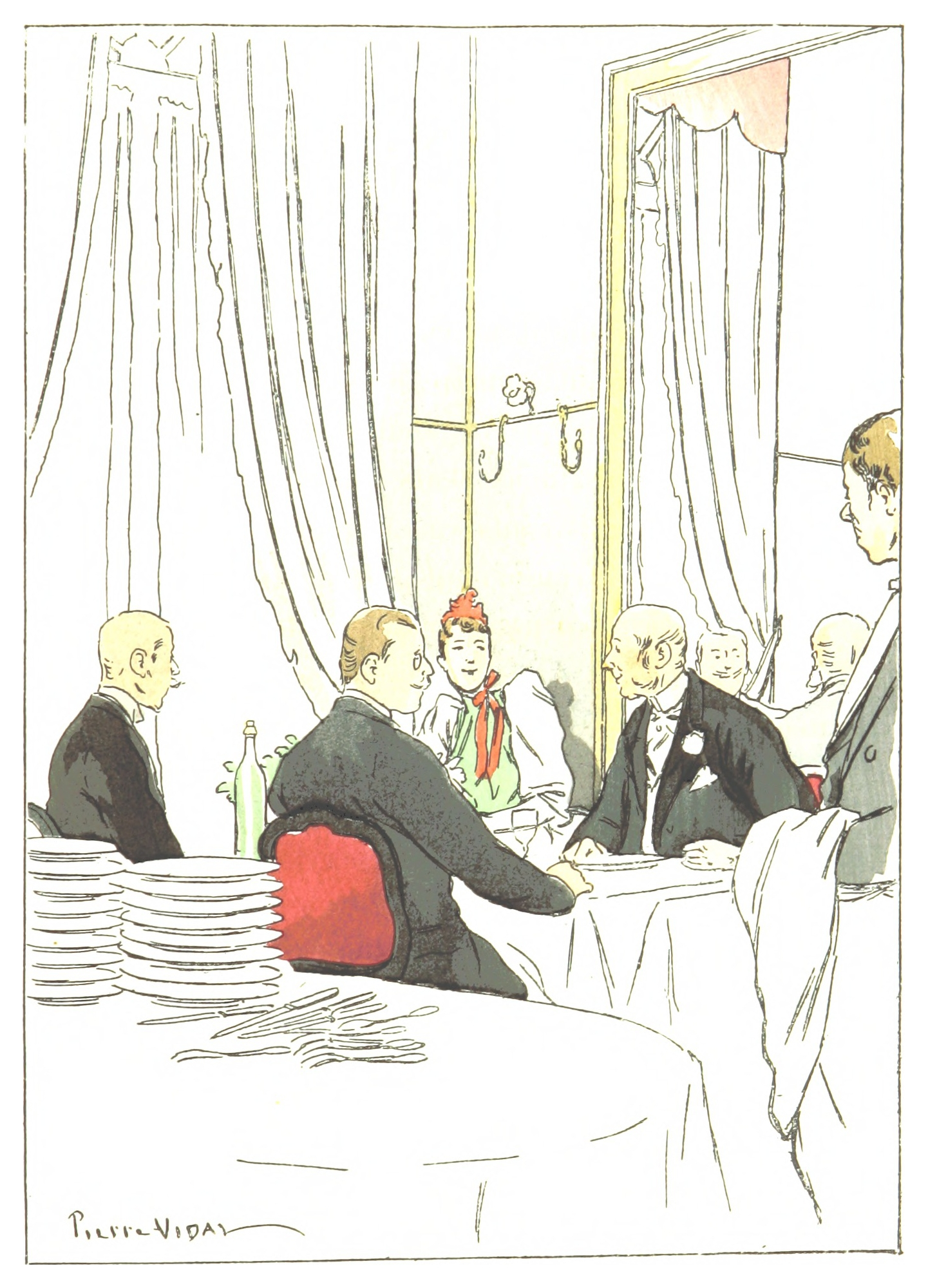
A la Maison Dorée – by Pierre Vidal (c. 1893)

The restaurant was divided into two sections: one section accessible from the boulevard, for ordinary people, and another section, accessible via rue Laffitte, for wealthy customers. This section had luxurious and discrete "Cabinets," or private rooms. The most desired was Cabinet 6, which was reserved for nobility as well as for very wealthy people. The restaurant's magnificent wine cellar, with 80,000 bottles of wine, attracted the rich revelers and party-goers of Paris.

People who dined there included the future King Edward VII, the great art collector Richard Seymour-Conway, 4th Marquess of Hertford (who lived opposite in 2 Rue Laffitte), and the Baron de Saint-Cricq. Novelists of the time could be found there, most famously Balzac, who had a character from his novels, Lucien de Rubempré, eat there. In the first book of the novel In Search of Lost Time, Marcel Proust's character Swann enters the restaurant looking for Odette: when he doesn't find her there, an overwhelming sense of fear makes clear to him that he has deeply fallen in love with her. The restaurant is also mentioned in the novel The Old Wives' Tale by Arnold Bennett.

It has been claimed that the dish tournedos Rossini was created by the chef of the Maison Dorée, Casimir Moisson, who created the recipe for the composer Gioachino Rossini, a regular customer.

In the building above the restaurants, several newspapers opened editorial offices. In 1853, Alexandre Dumas moved the offices of his newspaper Le Mousquetaire to the building.

The same building was the site of the 8th and last Impressionist painting exhibition, which took place on 15 May 1886. Impressionism, which had started at 35 boulevard des Capucines in 1874, ended on boulevard des Italiens 12 years later.

== The end ==
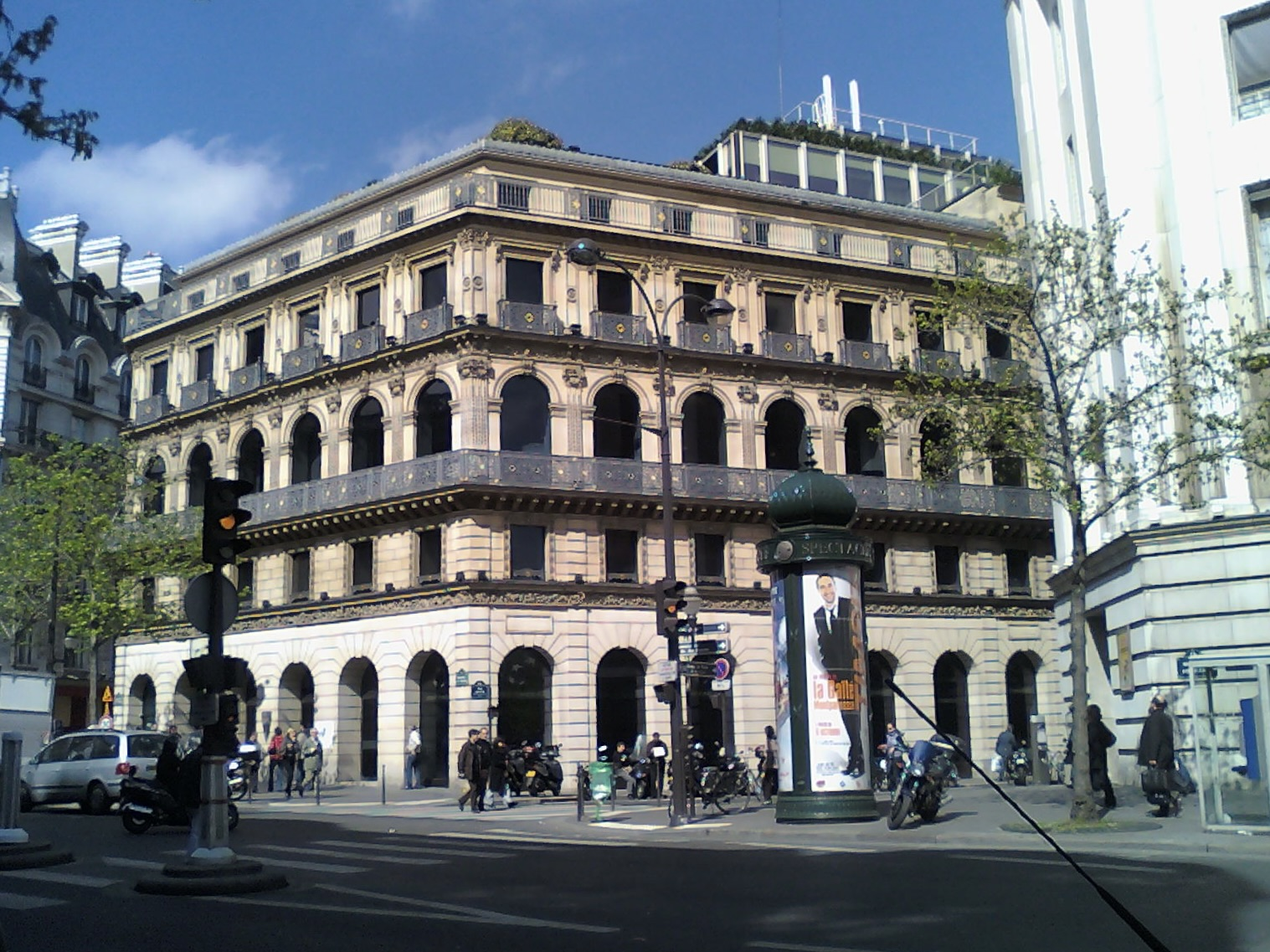
BNP-Paribas headquarters, 2009

The Maison Dorée finally closed in 1902. The building was divided into several offices and shops. In 1909, part of the building became a post office.

Banque Nationale de Paris, which was headquartered just across rue Laffitte, purchased the building in 1970 and had it renovated by architect Pierre Dufau. During the planning process, French Minister of Culture Maurice Druon, facing pressure from a neighborhood preservation committee, asked the company to maintain the building's historic facade. Dufau, "in one day of rage against the old timers," created a new project in which he proposed to integrate an entirely new interior into the historic facade. This marked the first transformation in what became a highly controversial architectural movement called facadism.

== Sources ==
- (in French) http://www.terresdecrivains.com/La-Maison-Doree
