= Boulevard des Italiens, Paris (painting) =

Painting by John Crome

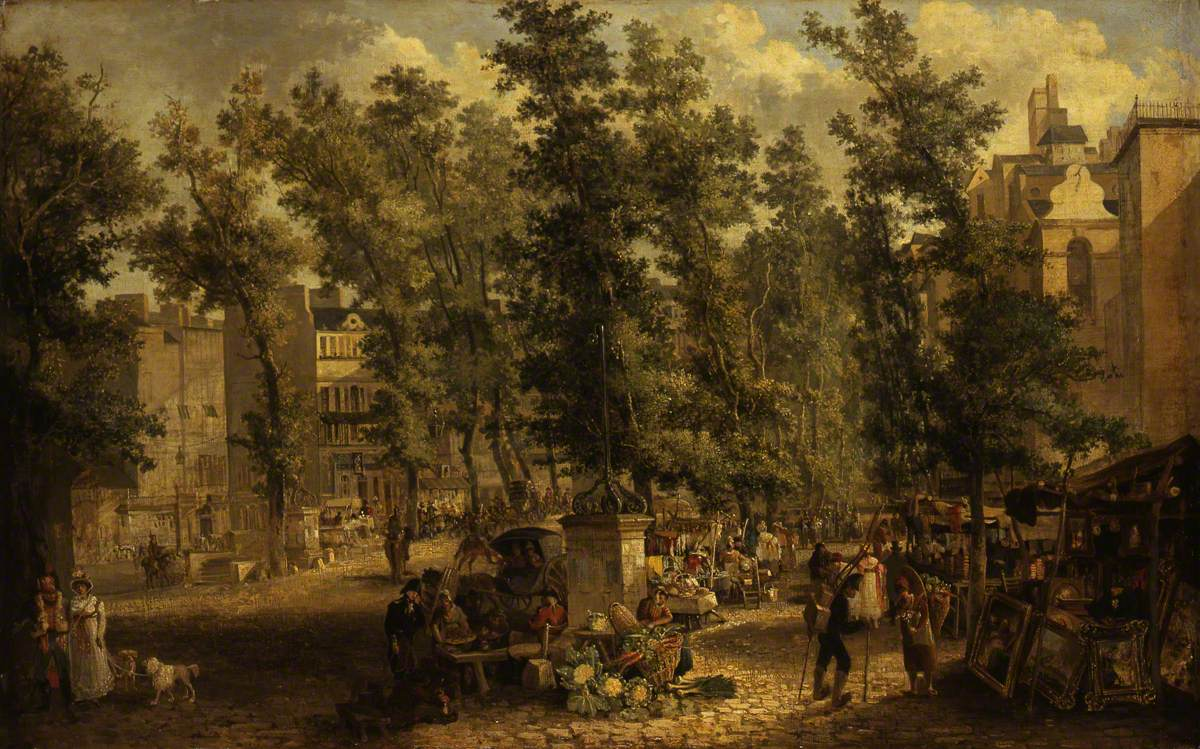
- Artist: John Crome
- Year: 1815
- Type: Oil on canvas, landscape painting
- Dimensions: 54.5 cm × 87.3 cm (21.5 in × 34.4 in)
- Location: Norwich Castle, Norfolk

Boulevard des Italiens, Paris is an oil on canvas landscape painting by the English artist John Crome, from 1815. It is shown at the Norwich Castle, in Norfolk.

== History and description ==
It depicts a scene on the Boulevard des Italiens in Paris. Featuring one of the Grand Boulevards of the city, it was produced, based on a sketch made during the artist's visit to the French capital in the wake of the 1814 Peace of Paris that ended the Napoleonic Wars.

Crome was a prominent member of the Norwich School of artists known for their East Anglian landscapes. He displayed a Norfolk landscape at the Salon of 1814 at the Louvre and produced three views of Paris base on his visit.

The painting is in a private collection but has been on a long-term loan to Norwich Castle.

== Bibliography ==
- Brown, David Blayney, Hemingway, Andrew & Lyles, Anne. Romantic Landscapes: The Norwich School of Painters. Harry N. Abrams, 2000.
- Binyon, Laurence. John Crome and John Sell Cotman. Seeley and Company, 1897.
- Hawcroft, Francis C. John Crome 1768-1821. Arts Council, 1968.
- Noon, Patrick & Bann, Stephen. Constable to Delacroix: British Art and the French Romantics. Tate, 2003.
