= Chromium (disambiguation) =

Chromium is a chemical element with symbol Cr and atomic number 24.

Chromium may also refer to:

- Chromium (computer graphics), a system for OpenGL rendering on clusters of computers
- Chromium (web browser), the open source counterpart to Google Chrome
  - Ungoogled Chromium, a fork of the chromium web browser unaffiliated with Google that specifically does not rely on Google-specific web services
  - ChromiumOS, the open source operating system counterpart to Google ChromeOS
- Chromium (film), a 2015 Albanian film
- Hexavalent chromium, any chrome compound in the +6 oxidation state

== See also ==
- Chromium deficiency, for the role of chromium in biology and nutrition
- Chromium B.S.U., an open-source space shooter game
- Chrome (disambiguation)
- Cr (disambiguation)
- Isotopes of chromium
