= Microsoft Vizact =

Program to create interactive documents

- A screenshot of Microsoft Vizact 2000 running on Windows 2000.
- Developer(s): Microsoft
- Final release: 9.0 / April 1, 2000; 24 years ago
- Operating system: Microsoft Windows
- Type: HTML+TIME animation
- License: Proprietary
- Website: Vizact

Microsoft Vizact 2000 is a discontinued program that allowed creation of interactive documents using HTML+TIME, adding effects such as animation. It allowed users to create dynamic documents for the Web. It was preceded by Liquid Motion. Vizact 2000 was "the first document activation application" according to Microsoft. Development of Vizact 2000 was ended due to unpopularity and was discontinued on April 1, 2000.

"Vizact helps solve this problem by giving Office users the ability to create documents that harness the dynamic nature of the Web, without having to be Web authors or programmers." Karl Jacob, product unit manager of Microsoft's Document Activation Group.

Features of Vizact 2000 included:

- See a visual representation of the items in user's document that change over time.
- Interactive bullets condense blocks of text, reducing the amount of information readers see initially.
- Create documents that address multiple audiences but don't confuse individual readers.
- Access templates to get started quickly, then modify them to fit user's needs.
- Choose from 30 professionally designed effects to help user communicate better and impress user's audience.

Vizact 2000 faces an issue running on Windows 2000 with SP2 or later due to the Sun v. Microsoft trial and the removal of Microsoft Java Virtual Machine in Windows 2000 SP2 or higher. Therefore, running it on Windows 95, Windows 98, Windows ME, Windows 2000 SP1 or reinstalling the Microsoft Java Virtual Machine is required in order for the software to run.

== See also ==
- Liquid Motion
- DirectAnimation
- HTML+TIME
