= Mousehold Heath (painting) =

Painting by John Crome

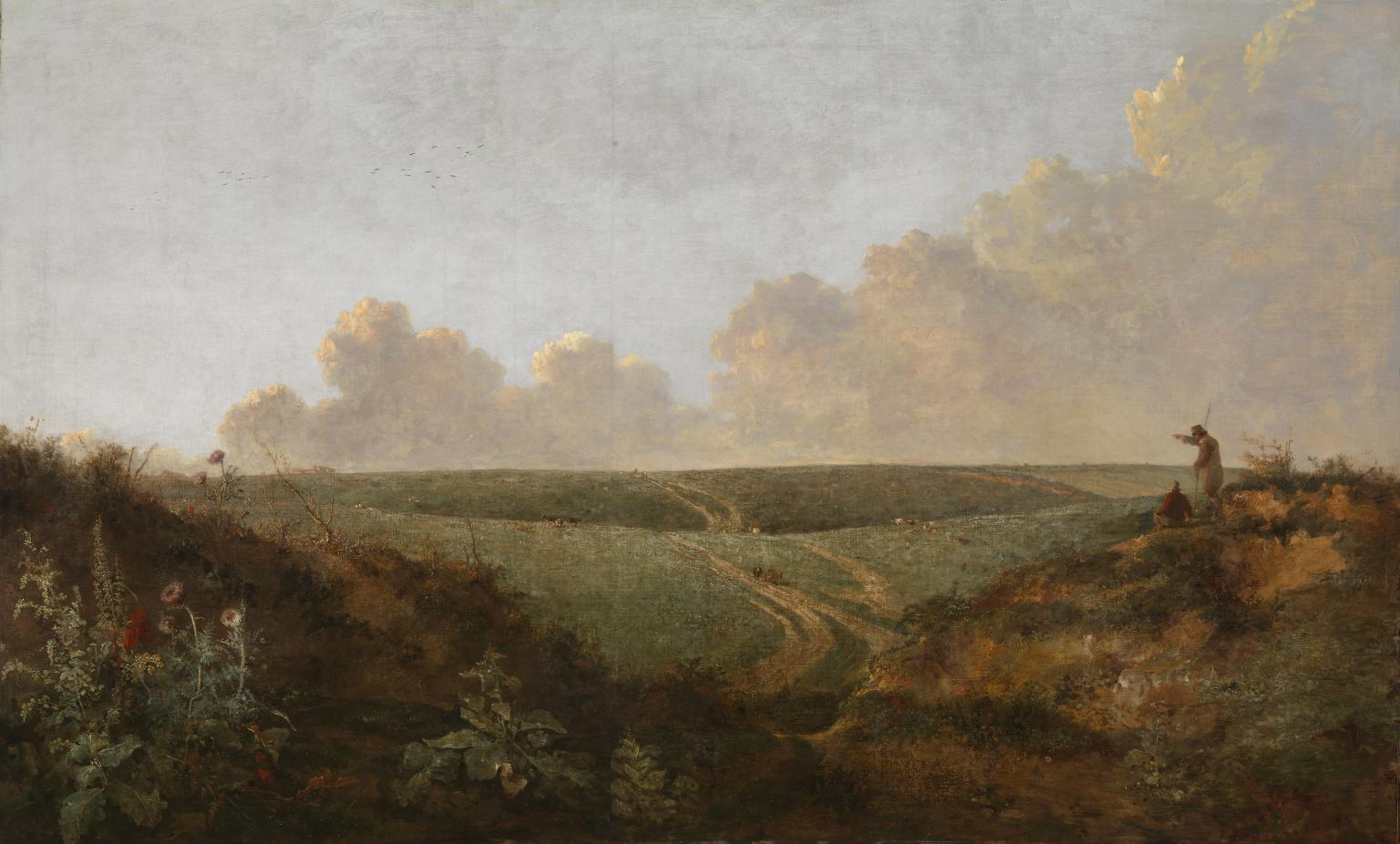
- Artist: John Crome
- Year: 1818-1820
- Type: Oil on canvas, landscape painting
- Dimensions: 109.8 cm × 181 cm (43.2 in × 71 in)
- Location: Tate Britain; London

Mousehold Heath is an oil on canvas landscape painting by the English artist John Crome, from 1818-1820. It is held at the Tate Britain, in London.

== Description ==
It depicts a view of Mousehold Heath on the eastern side of Norwich. The view shows a majestic landscape, extending to the horizon. It is crossed by a road, approximately at the middle of the field. Some cattle is seen roaming freely in the open land. At the left, two men seem to be talking, while contemplating the view, one of them is standing, with a cane, and pointing, the other is seated in the ground. Some wild flowers are seen in the foreground, at the bottom left side of the painting.

Crome was a member of the Norwich School of artists, who depicted landscapes from Norfolk. Mousehole Heath was a historic piece of common land, but by the time Crome painted the scene it had largely been enclosed.

Today the painting is in the collection of the Tate Britain, having been acquired in 1863.

== Bibliography ==
- Hawcroft, Francis C. John Crome 1768-1821. Arts Councilz 1968.
- Waites, Ian Common Land in English Painting, 1700-1850. Boydell Press, 2012.
