= The River Wensum, Norwich =

Painting by John Crome

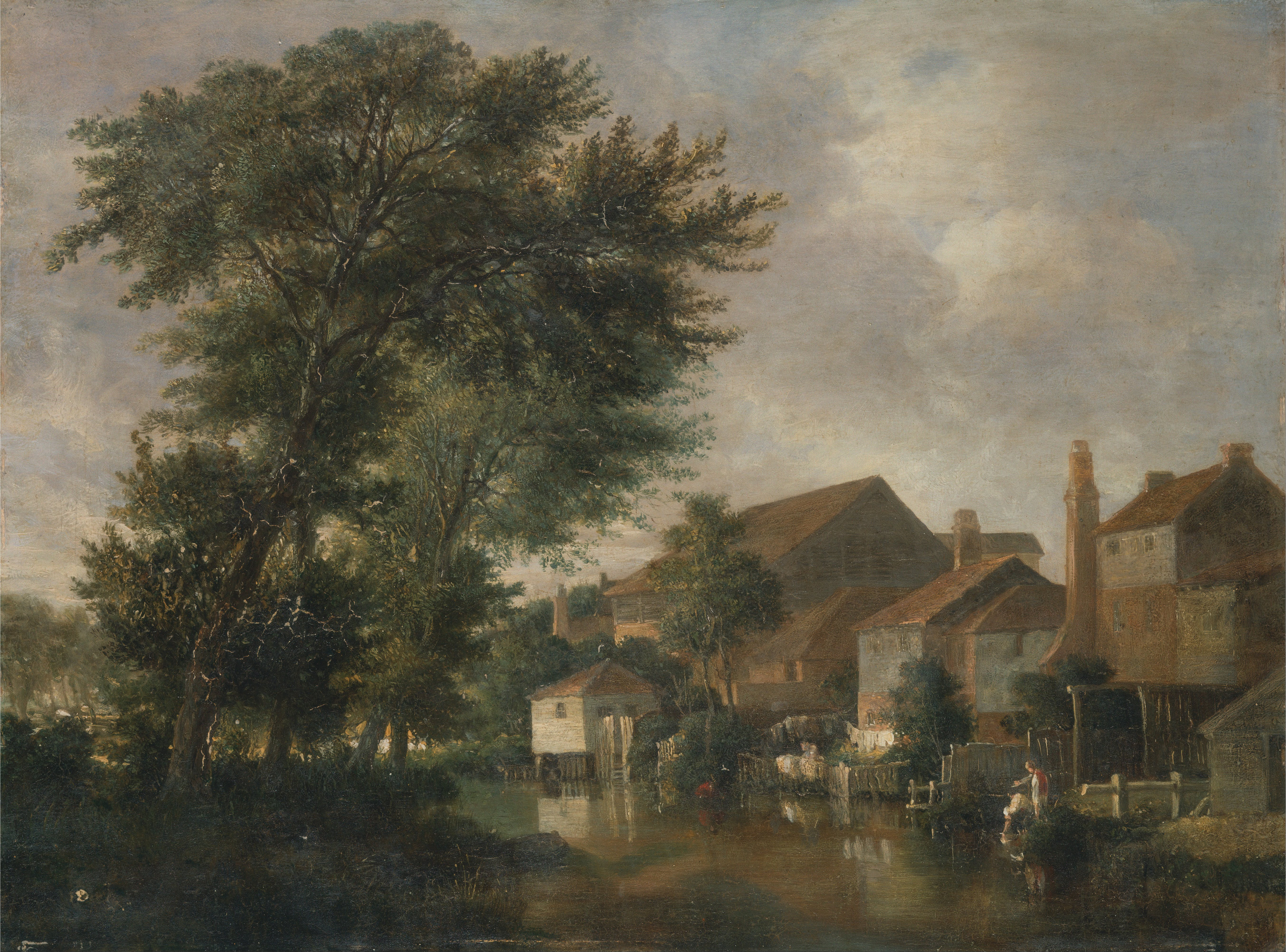
- Artist: John Crome
- Year: c. 1814
- Type: Oil on panel, landscape painting
- Dimensions: 53.3 cm × 87 cm (21.0 in × 34 in)
- Location: Yale Center for British Art; New Haven

The River Wensum, Norwich is an 1814 landscape painting by the British artist John Crome. It features a view of New Mills on the River Wensum on the outskirts of Norwich in Norfolk.

Crome was a member of the Norwich School of artists who produced landscapes of East Anglia. This was possibly the work that Crome displayed at the Salon of 1814 at the Louvre in Paris. Today it is in the Yale Center for British Art in Connecticut as part of the Paul Mellon Collection.

== Bibliography ==
- Brown, David Blayney, Hemingway, Andrew & Lyles, Anne. Romantic Landscapes: The Norwich School of Painters. Harry N. Abrams, 2000.
- Hawcroft, Francis C. John Crome 1768-1821. Arts Council, 1968.
- Noon, Patrick & Bann, Stephen. Constable to Delacroix: British Art and the French Romantics. Tate, 2003.
