= Microsoft Liquid Motion =

Software to create Java animations

Microsoft Liquid Motion was a product from Microsoft to create Java animations. It was based on technology acquired from Dimension-X. A beta was released in 1998, and version 1.0 was released soon thereafter to compete with Macromedia Flash. The product was eventually discontinued by Microsoft in 2000 due to lack of popularity. Since Liquid Motion created Java-based animations, they were cross-platform and browser-independent.

== See also ==
- Microsoft Vizact 2000
- DirectAnimation
- Microsoft Silverlight
