= Jupiter Media Metrix =

American analytics company

Jupiter Media Metrix, an American media measurement and analytics company, was created via the merger of Jupiter Communications and Media Metrix in June 2000.

The Media Metrix part of Jupiter Media Metrix was subsequently sold to comScore. The AdRelevance product was sold to Nielsen NetRatings in 2002 after the FTC blocked a proposed acquisition of Jupiter Media Metrix by NetRatings, and the Jupiter Research business was sold to INT Media Group in June 2002 for $250,000 plus the assumption of liabilities.
