= John Berney Crome =

English painter

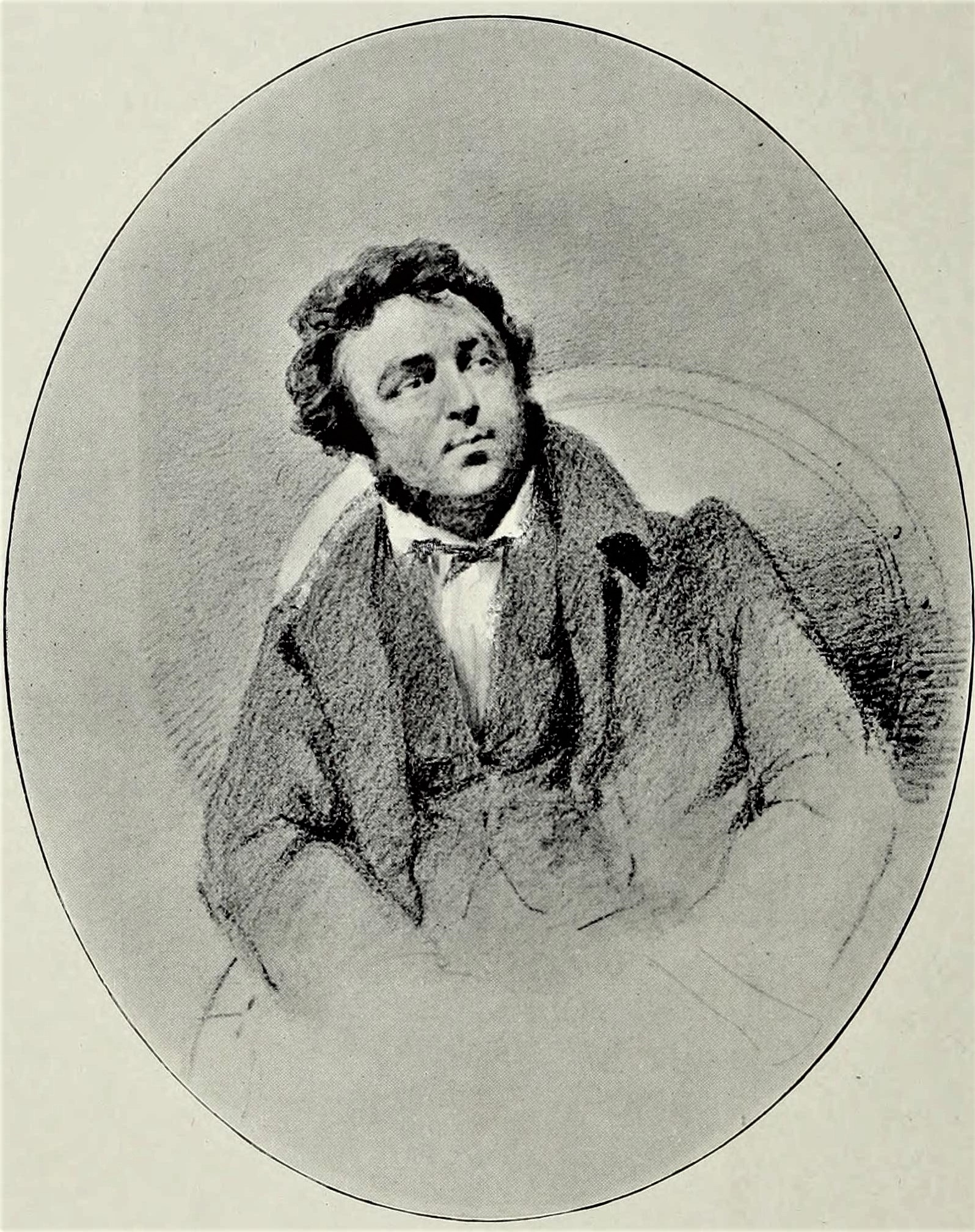
- Born: 1 December 1794; Norwich, England
- Died: 15 September 1842 (aged 47); Norwich, England
- Known for: Landscape painting
- Movement: Norwich School of painters

John Berney (or Barney) Crome (1 December 1794 – 15 September 1842) was an English landscape and marine painter associated with the Norwich School of painters. He is sometimes known by the nickname 'Young Crome' to distinguish him from his father John, known as 'Old Crome'.

== Early life ==
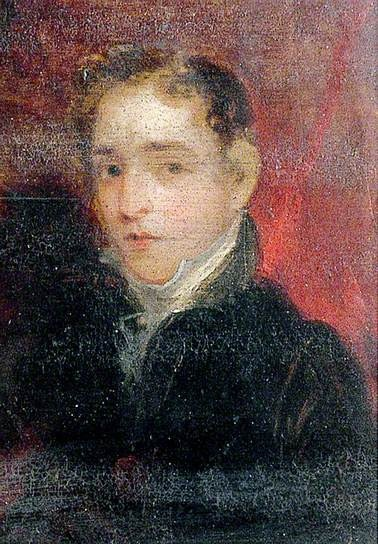
John Berney Crome, c.1820

John Berney Crome was born in Norwich, Norfolk, on 8 December 1794, and christened on 14 December at St George's Church, Colegate, Norwich. He was the eldest of the seven surviving children of John Crome (1768–1821), painter, and his wife, Phoebe Berney (also known as Phoebe Barney). His father was a distinguished landscape artist and a founder of the Norwich Society of Artists.

Realising his own educational deficiency, he determined his son should have a good education, and John Berney Crome attended Norwich School – the Grammar School - until he was eighteen. He was educated when Dr. Samuel Forster and the Rev. Edward Valpy were headmasters at the school. At the same time, with ambitions of becoming an artist, he accompanied his father on sketching expeditions. In 1816 he went with his school friend George Vincent, and a doctor, Benjamin Steel (who afterwards married Crome’s sister) on an excursion to Paris.

== Artistic career ==
Crome assisted his father in teaching and was appointed as landscape painter to the Duke of Sussex. He became a member of the Norwich Society of Artists and exhibited many of his pictures there between 1806 and 1830. He was appointed Vice-President of the Society in 1818, and subsequently President on several occasions.

On the death of John Crome in April 1821, John Berney Crome continued his father's art teaching practice and occupied the family house in Gildengate Street, Norwich, to which he added a studio. In conjunction with John Sell Cotman, he took a lively interest in the Norwich Society of Artists in 1828, which had closed in 1825 after the demolition of its old premises. Between 1811 and 1843 he had many works exhibited at the Royal Academy, British Institution and Society of British Artists in London, and made trips to the continent, drawing and painting in France, Holland, Belgium and Italy. His work shows the influence of his father, and like his father he painted many moonlight effects, his 1834 River Scene By Moonlight being a prime example.

As a result of his extravagant habits, Crome was made bankrupt in 1831, and the contents of his father's house had to be sold off. Many paintings made by both father and son were disposed of at this time. He subsequently moved to Great Yarmouth in 1835, where he continued to teach drawing. An 'incurable illness' was the cause of his death on 15 September 1842.

Crome was twice married, but had no children. He was known as a man of genial character and jovial disposition, and his portrait, one of two executed by H B Love, hangs in the Castle Museum, Norwich.

== Works ==
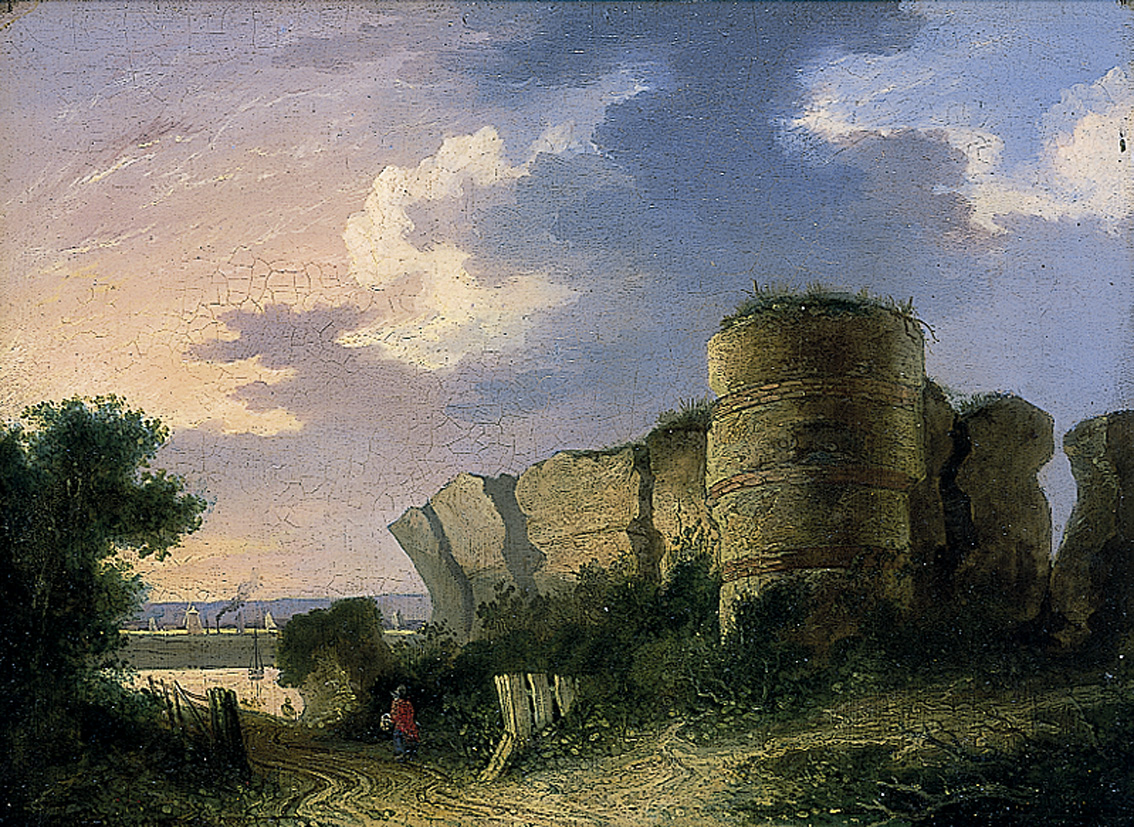
Burgh Castle, undated (Norfolk Museums Collections)

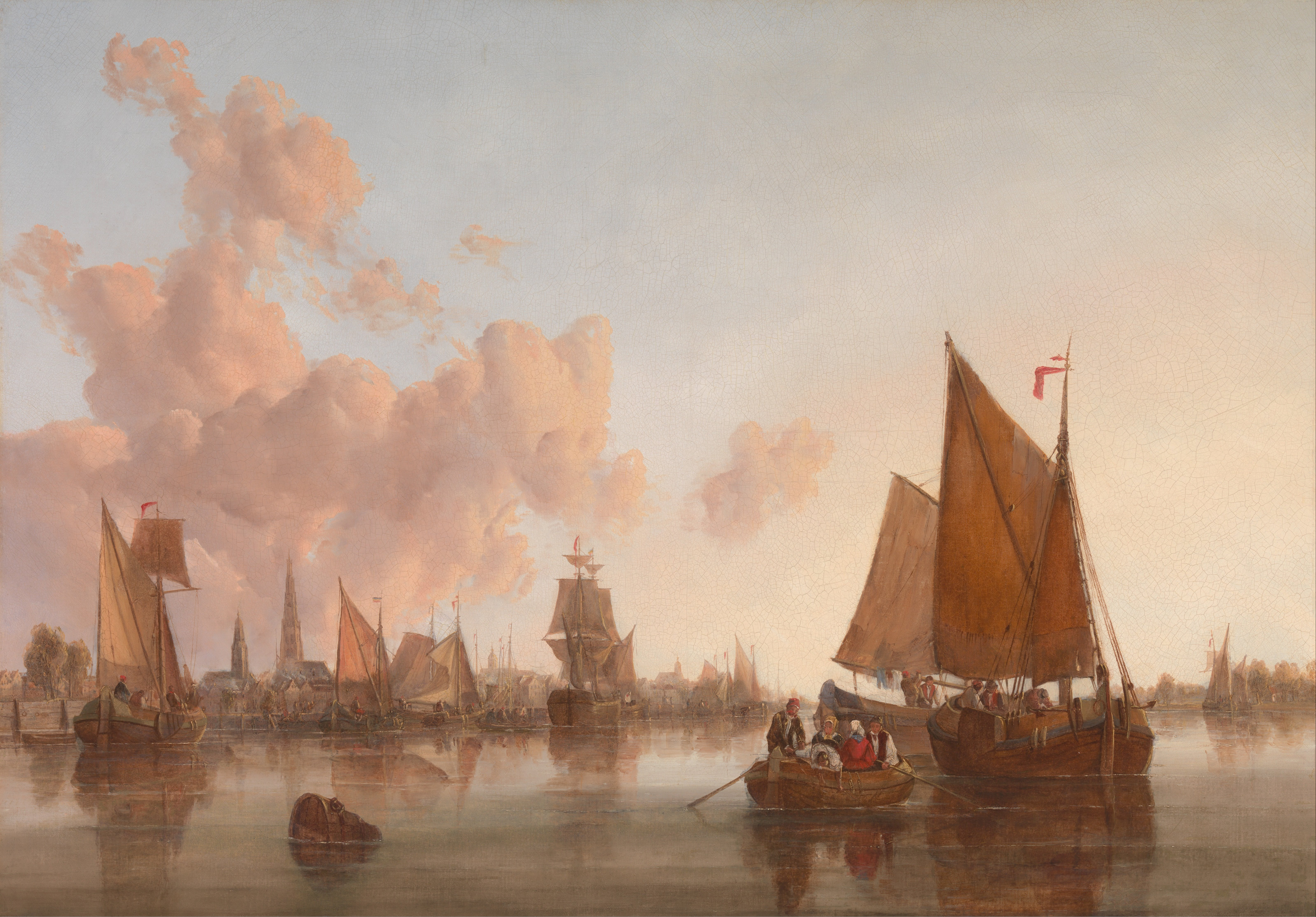
Sailing Boats and Barges on a Dutch(?) Estuary c.1825 (Yale Center for British Art)

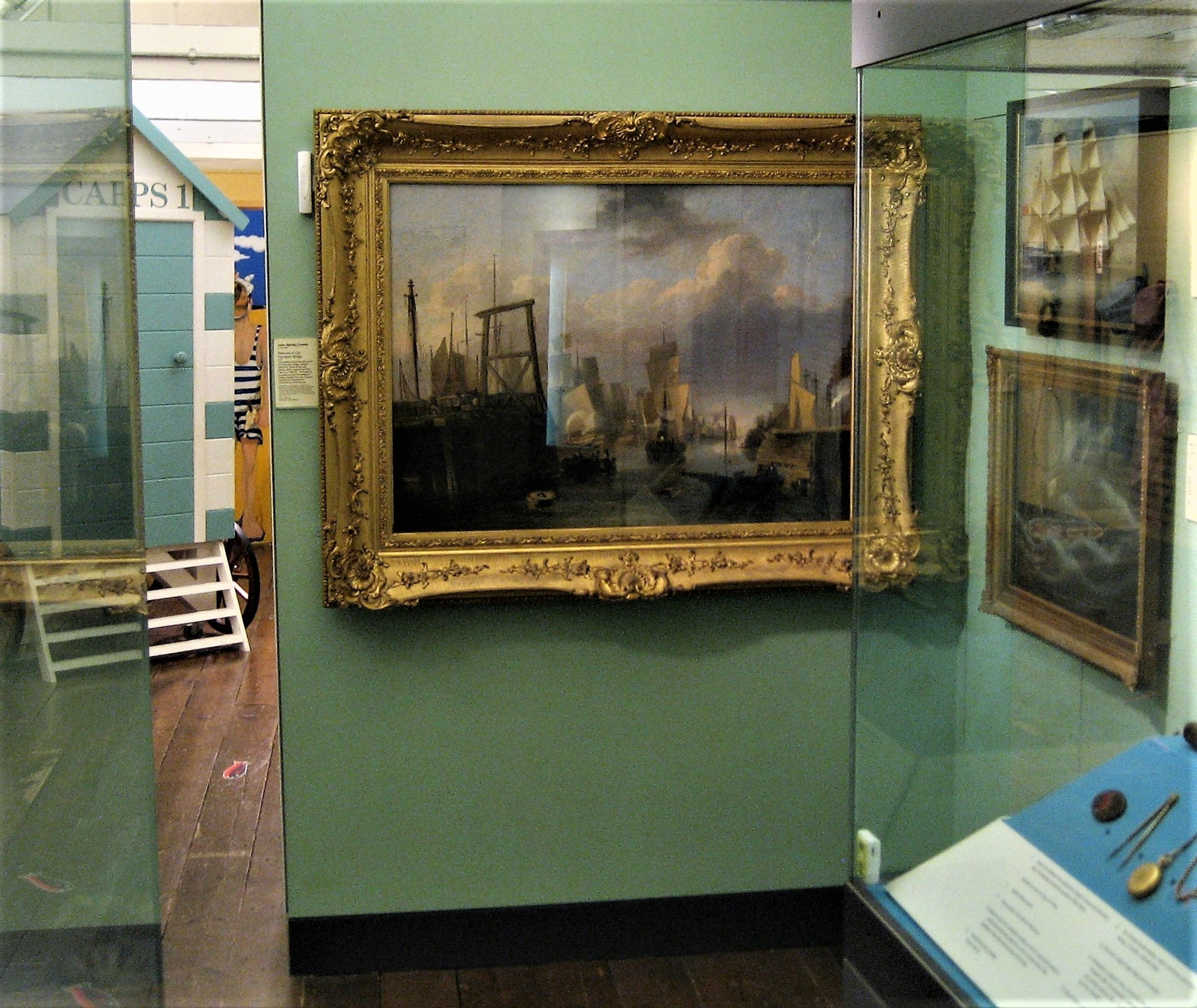
Paintings in the Tide and Time Museum, Great Yarmouth, including Crome's Removal of Old Yarmouth Bridge (1837)

John Berney Crome worked in oils, watercolours and pencil, painting coastal and rural scenes, both at home and abroad. He made frequent visits to the continent, and the subjects of some of his pictures were taken from places in France, Holland, Belgium, and Italy. Crome's paintings can bear a strong resemblance to those of his father, and also of fellow Norwich School artist George Vincent, and their works have at times been confused with each others.

Between 1811 and 1843 he exhibited seven works at the Royal Academy, thirty-five at the British Institution, and fifty-five at the Society of British Artists. Many of his works were exhibited at the Edinburgh Society of Artists and the Society of British Artists. Norfolk Museums has a significant collection of his work, most housed in the Castle Museum, and his paintings are also currently kept by the Tate Gallery, the Yale Centre for British Art, the UK Government Art Collection, the Sheffield Museums, the Royal Albert Memorial Museum, Oxford Town Hall, the Williamson Art Gallery & Museum, the Barber Institute of Fine Arts, and the English Heritage Collection, Kenwood.

While John Berney Crome’s paintings have never reached the status associated with the great English landscape artists, some have fetched almost $10,000, and in 2018 a relatively small (perhaps 37 cm by 32 cm) oil on canvas painting of a shoreline landscape marine scene was offered for sale through Madrigallery in the USA for $35,000.
