= DirectX Media =

Microsoft Windows multimedia-related APIs

DirectX Media is a set of multimedia-related APIs for Microsoft Windows complementing DirectX.

Retained Mode was used by a variety of applications and can still be implemented on systems newer than XP by copying the d3drm.dll file from an older version of Windows to the system32 directory (for 32-bit Windows) or SysWOW64 directory (for 64-bit Windows) to regain system-wide support.
