= Mailbox (email) =

Encrypted email and web hosting service in Germany

mailbox
- Available in: English, German
- Headquarters: Berlin, Germany
- Owner: Heinlein Hosting GmbH
- Website: mailbox.org/en/
- Commercial: Yes
- Registration: Required
- Launched: 20 February 2014; 12 years ago
- Current status: Online

mailbox (formerly mailbox.org) is a paid, encrypted Email hosting service offered by Heinlein Hosting GmbH, a company based in Germany. The encryption system uses PGP like most other encrypted email providers. Since September 2025, mailbox positions itself as a "digitally sovereign workplace" and offers an integrated suite of email, calendar, video conferencing, and cloud storage. It competes against Microsoft 365 and Google Workspace as a German-based provider. Its target customers include private, business, school and public authorities.

== History ==
Historically, mailbox.org traces back to JPBerlin, which has been offering independent and ad-free email accounts based in Germany since 1989. JPBerlin was founded by the former Junge Presse Berlin (Young Press Berlin) with Peer Heinlein as administrator. Peer Heinlein continues to operate it as an independent service within his Heinlein company group to this day in the spirit of the original association.

In the wake of the global surveillance and espionage affair, mailbox.org was created in 2014 according to founder Peer Heinlein from the desire to build an "internationally scaling mail provider that sets new standards in terms of security, transparency and freedom from advertising".

Since 2016, mailbox has offered a Tor exit node for anonymizing connection data. If mailbox's services are accessed via the Tor anonymization network and the Tor exit server, mailbox no longer logs IP addresses that would be suitable for data retention.

After mailbox.org had been providing email addresses for teachers in Thuringia on behalf of the Thuringian Ministry of Education, Youth and Sport since 2020, the Berlin Senate Department for Education, Youth and Family also had all of its approximately 33,000 Berlin teachers at public schools provided with secure email accounts by mailbox.org starting in 2021. However, in December 2022, Berlin schools were again planned to convert from mailbox email to Microsoft Exchange emails as reported by Der Tagesspiegel.

In September 2025, mailbox.org was renamed mailbox.

Historical logos of mailbox

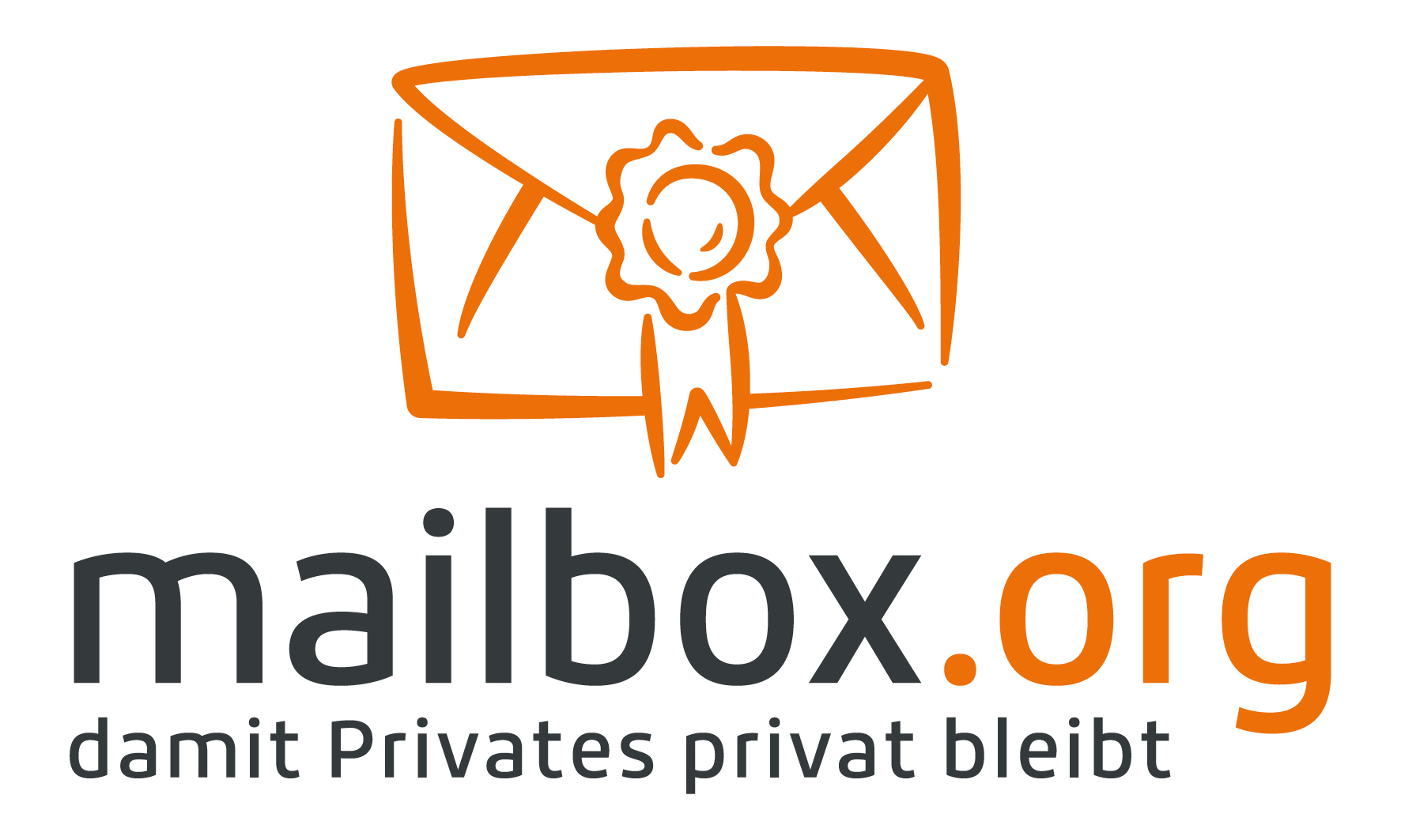
2014 – 2018

2018 – 2021

2021 – 2025

=== Data centers and infrastructure ===
Behind mailbox is the Heinlein Group in the IT industry. mailbox operates its servers exclusively in German data centers in Berlin, which are supplied with green energy. No data is transmitted abroad, thereby excluding legal uncertainties.

== Features ==
=== Services ===
mailbox divides its offerings into those for private customers and those for business customers. The offerings include email services with spam and virus protection, web groupware including online office suite, a proprietary video conferencing system, and file sharing – as an alternative to Microsoft 365, Google Workspace, or Google Drive hosted in Germany.

=== Pricing ===
mailbox charges private customers according to the prepaid principle. If desired, payment can also be made by cash deposit into the bank account or anonymously by cash by post.

=== Security ===
mailbox developed various new approaches to protect user data: for example, the provider was the first to introduce the option of subsequently encrypting all incoming emails with the user's public PGP key, thus providing special protection against access by third parties should the mailbox password be lost or compromised.

When using the webmail offer, it is possible to encrypt and decrypt emails using PGP and since November 2023 also using S/MIME without special client software (email program with any plugins that may be required), without necessarily using a browser extension such as Mailvelope. Keys and the encryption process take place outside the user's sphere of influence on mailbox's servers, which, however, contradicts the principle of end-to-end encryption. However, according to Peer Heinlein, CEO of mailbox, the private keys are stored on the servers at all times with a password known only to the user, so they cannot be viewed by administrators. In addition, this avoids the need to store private PGP or S/MIME keys on end devices that are perceived as insecure.

Mailbox used Extended Validation Certificates such as DANE and DNSSEC. Through the selection of cipher suites and additional HTTP security headers such as HSTS, a particularly high level of encryption and protection against manipulation by third parties is achieved.

=== Video conferencing ===
The video conference service is based on the open-source OpenTalk software.

=== Additional features ===
Users of mailbox can also be reached via Jabber chat through a dedicated XMPP server. The service also offers address books, calendars and an online office suite that includes a word processor and spreadsheet application.

== Software used ==
As the basis for the webmail interface, mailbox uses the free software Open-Xchange OX App Suite from the company Open-Xchange. For video conferencing, OpenTalk is used.

== Data protection and advertising ==
The service does not send advertising emails and according to its own statements does not analyze the contents of users' emails, as is common practice with the world's most widely used email service Gmail – see also Gmail's business model. The service removes client IP addresses and revealing information about the email client and operating system used from emails sent by its users.

== Transparency ==
mailbox publishes an annual transparency report detailing the number of information requests it received from various governments.

== Reception ==
In February 2015 and October 2016, mailbox.org became a test winner alongside Posteo by Stiftung Warentest.

In June 2021, mailbox.org became a test winner alongside the Swiss Linuxfabrik in the "Cloud Service" category by the Swiss consumer magazine K-Tipp.

A 2018 review by Ctrl Blog highlighted mailbox.org as a feature-rich and privacy-focused email provider. The reviewer praised its support for PGP encryption, productivity tools and commitment to user privacy. However, the review also criticized the complexity of the PGP setup for non-technical users and noted that some user interface elements could be confusing or unintuitive.

== Legal dispute with Russian supervisory authority Roskomnadzor ==
After the Russian telecommunications supervisory authority Roskomnadzor requested a ban of mailbox.org in Russia in December 2019, mailbox.org declared in January 2020 that they would be legally represented in a legal dispute, as they regarded the authority's actions as an attempt at Internet censorship. In February 2020, Roskomnadzor withdrew the blocking request filed against mailbox.org after mailbox.org agreed to have its own publicly viewable web imprint data entered into the Russian telecommunications directory.

== See also ==
- Mailfence
- Tuta
- Proton Mail
- Posteo
