= Mailbox provider =

Provider of email hosting

A mailbox provider, mail service provider or, somewhat improperly, email service provider is a provider of email hosting. It implements email servers to send, receive, accept, and store email for other organizations or end users, on their behalf.

The term "mail service provider" was coined in the Internet Mail Architecture document RFC 5598.

== Types ==
There are various kinds of email providers. There are paid and free ones, possibly sustained by advertising. Some allow anonymous users, whereby a single user can get multiple, apparently unrelated accounts. Some require full identification credentials; for example, a company may provide email accounts to full-time staff only. Often, companies, universities, organizations, groups, and individuals that manage their mail servers themselves adopt naming conventions that make it straightforward to identify who is the owner of a given email address. Besides control of the local names, insourcing may provide for data confidentiality, network traffic optimization, and fun.

Mailbox providers typically accomplish their task by implementing Simple Mail Transfer Protocol (SMTP) and possibly providing access to messages through Internet Message Access Protocol (IMAP), the Post Office Protocol, Webmail, or a proprietary protocol. Parts of the task can still be outsourced, for example virus and spam filtering of incoming mail, or authentication of outgoing mail.

=== ISP-based email ===
Many mailbox providers are also access providers. Not the core product, their email services could lack some interesting features, such as IMAP, Transport Layer Security, or SMTP Authentication —in fact, an ISP can do without the latter, as it can recognize its clients by the IP addresses it assigns them.

=== Free mail providers ===
Launched in the 1990s, AOL Mail, Hotmail, Lycos, Mail.com and Yahoo! Mail were among the early providers of free email accounts, joined by Gmail in 2004. They attract users because they are free and can advertise their service on every message.

According to American entrepreneur Steve Jurvetson, Hotmail grew from zero to 12 million users in 18 months. In 1997, Microsoft purchased Hotmail for $400 million and relaunched it as MSN Hotmail the same year. This was relaunched as Outlook.com in 2012.

=== Premium email services ===
Paid equivalent of free mail providers. Much less popular than free mail, they target a niche of users.

=== Vanity email ===
It is also possible to run a shim service, providing no access but just forwarding all messages to another account, which does not lend itself to direct use, for example because it is temporary or just less appealing.

== Role as identifier ==
A mailbox provider is the administrator of the registered domain name that forms the domain-part of its email addresses. As such, it controls the MX records that specify which hosts will receive email destined to those addresses. The operators of those hosts define the meaning of the local-part of an address by associating it to a mailbox, which in turn can be associated to a user. The mailbox provider also specifies how users can read their mail, possibly creating SRV records to ease email client configuration, or giving detailed instructions.

Email addresses are convenient tokens for identifying people, even at web sites unrelated to email. In fact, they are unique, and allow password reminders to be sent at will.

From a bureaucracy-oriented point of view, there is no formal undertaking beyond domain name registration. This role is based on IETF standards, and, unlike X.400 and other ITU-T works, in and of itself requires no arrangements with local authorities. The notion of Administration Management Domain (ADMD) is derived afterwards, from empirical evidence. However, local authorities concerned with Internet privacy issues may add rules and requisites on top of the original Internet email design.

== See also ==
- Email hosting service
- Email mailbox
- Internet service provider
- Webmail
- Web mail server
- Comparison of webmail providers
