= Ilkposta =

ilkposta is a free webmail service, located in Istanbul, Turkey. The service started as a research and development (R&D) project in 2001. This project primarily intended to decrease E-mail spams in users' inbox. Secondary focus given on user experience for providing better server responsiveness where bandwidth (computing) is a profound issue.

Perl based open-source software, Open WebMail is used in server side, for the purpose of simplicity.

== Features ==
- HTML e-mail
- Graylisting for e-mail.
- E-mail filtering and virus scanning.
- 5GB user space per account.
- E-mail independent file storage for future download.
- Search function for webmail and file storage.
- Calendar for appointments, tasks and notes.

== Recognition ==
The service is listed in Dmoz as a free Turkish e-mail service.

== Awards ==
PCnet journal of Turkey cited ilkposta among "10 best free" Turkish language supporting webmail services in 2008. The list contained "Gmail, Windows Live Hotmail, Yahoo! Mail, ekolay.net Eposta, Mynet Email, İstanbul.com, Inbox.com, Bigstring.com, İlkposta.com, Superonline Superposta."

== See also ==
E-mail
