= Posteo =

German email service

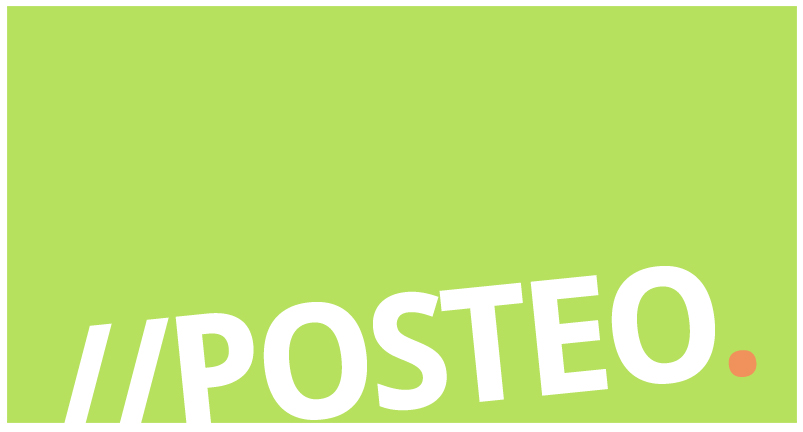
- Website type: Webmail
- Available in: Over 70 languages
- Headquarters: Berlin, Germany
- Owners: Patrik & Sabrina Löhr
- Website: posteo.de/en
- Commercial: Yes
- Registration: Required
- Users: More than 500,000
- Launched: 2009; 17 years ago

Posteo is an email service provider based in Berlin, Germany, offering paid email accounts for individuals and businesses. The service gained prominence during the aftermath of the post-2013 global surveillance disclosures, especially for its high standard security features and relative anonymity as it does not require any private information in the registration process.

Posteo offers support for DNSSEC/DANE and PGP (through Mailvelope in the web interface, which is running open source Roundcube). Additionally, they offer two-factor-authentication via TOTP, Extended Validation certificates, HPKP for the HTTPS connection, and various themes to choose from, including dark mode.

In 2022, Posteo had more than 500,000 active mail accounts.

== Data minimization and security ==
The company advertises its privacy by design. Both registration and payment are possible anonymously, and users' IP addresses are not stored.

Data transmissions between customers and the company are consistently encrypted using TLS. Since August 2013, Posteo has supported Perfect Forward Secrecy encryption, both for its own connections and for transmissions to other providers—at the time, it was one of the first German providers to support it for all email protocols. Perfect Forward Secrecy means that a new, random key is generated for each connection, which is then used to encrypt the connection. This prevents the subsequent decryption of intercepted data. Posteo uses Extended Validation certificates to authenticate its servers. Since May 2014, Posteo has supported the DANE/TLSA (DNS-based Authentication of Name Entities) protocol, thereby eliminating various vulnerabilities of TLS encryption, particularly during the transmission of emails between Posteo and other providers. To benefit from the additional security provided by DANE when accessing the site via a browser, a corresponding browser add-on is required. All Posteo servers are located in Germany, and their hard drives are AES-encrypted. Since October 2015, Posteo has been using HTTP Public Key Pinning, a technique employed by websites, to secure the HTTPS connection between the web interface and the user.

Since November 2014, webmail access can be further secured by two-factor authentication based on the TOTP standard. To prevent this from being circumvented by email programs using IMAP, POP3, or SMTP, customers can block these accesses upon request. Since May 2015, customers have been able to optionally activate encrypted email storage, so that all emails stored at Posteo are individually encrypted with the customer's (salted) password. Since July 2016, customers have been able to optionally activate the TLS delivery guarantee, so that outgoing emails are only sent to servers of other providers if an encrypted connection is possible. Since August 2016, the webmail interface has displayed whether the transmission path is secured by DANE before emails are sent.

The company relies on open standards and free software, including the JavaScript code used on its website and in its webmail. The source code of software that Posteo has co-developed is available under free licenses on GitHub. Against this background, Posteo has criticized the "E-Mail made in Germany" initiative from the outset as a closed, isolated solution.

In the 26th activity report of the Federal Commissioner for Data Protection and Freedom of Information, Andrea Voßhoff, published at the end of May 2017, Posteo was praised—without mentioning the company name. Posteo had “implemented data protection […] in a truly impressive way.” At the same time, Posteo published the audit report on which this statement was based, which had been prepared at the end of 2016. Among other things, the report praised the company’s internal, independent data protection officer, who also works in customer support the anonymous payment system, through which Posteo “does not collect any inventory data”; the company’s decision not to store “customer-identifiable IP addresses”; and its multi-layered encryption. In general, Posteo “takes the principle of data minimization very seriously.”

At the end of January 2019, the Federal Constitutional Court rejected a constitutional complaint by the email provider Posteo and ruled against Posteo's practice of not storing IP addresses. According to the ruling, an email provider like Posteo must collect IP addresses for the purpose of law enforcement if this has been ordered by a judge.

== Support for end-to-end encryption ==
Since January 2015, the company has offered automatic encryption of incoming emails using either S/MIME or PGP . To use this feature, users must submit their public S/MIME or PGP key to the company. Each email is then encrypted with this key after it arrives. This method does not replace true end-to-end encryption, as emails are only encrypted after they arrive on Posteo's servers, and not at the sender's end. Therefore, even with incoming encryption enabled, Posteo can still check emails for spam, for example.

At the end of December 2015, the company released an open-source plug-in for its Roundcube web interface, which facilitates PGP encryption in conjunction with the Mailvelope browser add-on. This includes querying and offering for import public keys obtained from various sources (key servers, listed in DNS as OPENPGPKEY) by Posteo servers. Private keys, plaintext messages, and cryptographic operations always remain under the user's control. Posteo strictly rejects encryption solutions where email providers offer server-side support, deeming them inherently insecure.

== Transparency report ==
In May 2014, the company became the first German email service to publish a transparency report on investigative and surveillance activities. In this report, the company stated that it had received seven requests from law enforcement agencies in 2013, two of which were formally correct. The company received political support in this matter from figures including Hans-Christian Ströbele and Christian Lange.

In July 2013, state security officers searched the company's premises. According to the company, the officers attempted to "coerce the company into unlawful cooperation and the disclosure of data." The company subsequently filed a criminal complaint against the officers involved. According to the company, the police officers claimed to have a warrant to search and seize all business records, but in reality, they only had a warrant to produce a single sheet of paper. The criminal investigation department wanted the company to program a script that would document which IP addresses Posteo users used to access their emails when logging in. This script would have made it possible to determine which email addresses belonged to the IP addresses known to the police.

In August 2015, the company published its transparency report for 2014, for the first time including redacted letters from the investigating authorities and focusing on key topics such as the manual disclosure of subscriber data pursuant to Section 113 of the German Telecommunications Act (TKG), public oversight of disclosure procedures pursuant to Sections 113 and 112 of the TKG, and the practice of judicial authorization.

The transparency report for 2016 (published in January 2017) notes that the number of requests from authorities decreased from 48 (2015) to 35 (2016), while still about half of the requests were not formally correct and were therefore answered negatively and reported to the respective data protection officers.

According to the transparency report for 2017, the number of government requests rose again to 48 (compared to 2015). However, Posteo argues that since the number of mailboxes has doubled since then, the request rate per mailbox has declined significantly.

== See also ==
- Comparison of webmail providers
