= Comparison of webmail providers =

The following tables compare general and technical information for a number of notable webmail providers who offer a web interface in English.

The list does not include web hosting providers who may offer email server and/or client software as a part of hosting package, or telecommunication providers (mobile network operators, internet service providers) who may offer mailboxes exclusively to their customers.

== General ==
General information on webmail providers and products

Product	Released	Cost	Mailbox storage	Attachment limit	Supported languages	Number of Email Addresses (incl. Aliases)	Conversation threading
AOL Mail	1993	Free (with ads)	Unlimited, limited to 1 TB for new accounts	25 MB	54	0	Yes
Fastmail	1999	$6/month or $60/year	2 GB to 100 GB	50 MB	37	600, plus 15 for every user in the account	Yes
Gmail (Google Account) (Note: Gmail is part of the Google Account, therefore a Google account is required. But a Google Account doesn't require Gmail and can be used with other mail providers)	2004	Free (with ads); $6/user/month on the user's domain	15 GB (can purchase more)	25 MB (10 GB per file via Google Drive)	71	30	Yes
GMX Mail	1997	Free (with ads) or Paid (€3–5/month)	65 GB (free for gmx.com), 1.5 GB (for gmx.de/gmx.net)	50 MB (free), 50–100 MB (paid)	English, German, Spanish, French	Free: 2 ProMail: 10 TopMail: 50	Yes
HEY	2020	Free 30-day trial $99/year	100 GB	300 MB	English	?	No
Hushmail	1999	$49.98 year (Premium)	10 GB (Premium)	20 MB per file, total 50 MB per mail	English	?	Paid
iCloud (Note: Must be an Apple (iPod, iPad, &c.) owner to obtain an account, but works on Windows, as well.)	2011	Free (no ads) or $0.99/month, $2.99/month, or $9.99/month (Note: 50 GB cost $0.99/month, 200 GB cost $2.99/month, or 2 TB cost $9.99/month)	5 GB (Free), 50 GB, 200 GB, or 2 TB monthly (Note: shared between file and email storage, customizable ratio)	20 MB (5 GB per message with Mail Drop via iCloud)	4	Free: 3 Paid: unlimited through "Hide My Email"	Yes
Kolab Now	2013	Free 30-day trial From 4.41 CHF/month (individuals), 5.38 CHF/month (groups)	2 GB, can purchase more	?	English	?	No
Lycos	1997	$4.95 per month $19.95 yearly	5 GB	35 MB	English	?	Paid
Mail.com	1995	Free (with ads) or $3.95/month or $19.95/year	65 GB	30 MB	English, Spanish, French	Free: 11 (1+10 aliases)	Paid
Mail.ru	1998	Free (with ads) or paid options	Unlimited	2 GB	11	?	Yes
mailbox	2014	30 day free trial Light: €1/month Standard: €3/month Premium: €9/month	Light: 2 GB; Standard: 10 GB; Premium: 25 GB	Light: no storage Standard: 5 GB; Premium: 50 GB	English, German	Light: 3 Standard: 25; Premium: 25	Yes
Mailfence	2013	Free (no ads) €3.50 ($3.85)/month (Entry) €9.50 ($10.45)/month (Pro) €29 ($31.90)/month (Ultra)	500 MB (free); 5 GB (Entry) or 20 GB (Pro) or 50 GB (Ultra)	10 MB (Free); 50 MB (Entry/Pro/Ultra)	11	?	Paid
Outlook, Hotmail (Microsoft Account) (Note: Outlook mail is part of a Microsoft Account. Although Microsoft Account is not a requirement, to access account settings, it has to be through done through the Microsoft Account. Login and sign up is always done through login.live.com domain)	1996 (Hotmail); 2012 (Outlook)	Free (with ads); Paid option	15 GB	32 MB (Unlimited via OneDrive)	106	?	Yes
Posteo	2009	€1/month to €1,45/month	4 GB storage (can be increased)	50 MB	3	2 included up to 20 for an additional charge of 0.10 EUR per alias per month	Yes
Proton Mail (Proton Account) (Note: Creation of Proton Mail automatically creates a Proton Account)	2014	Free (no ads); Multi-tiered pricing	500 MB (free) 1 GB (can be upgraded for free); 5 to 20 GB	25 MB	10	Free: 1 Plus: 10; Ultimate: 15	Yes
Rediffmail	1997	Free (with ads) and paid: ₹399 (US$4.30)/year for POP3; ₹50 (53¢ US)/month for mobile	Unlimited	25 MB	11	?	₹399 (US$4.30)
Startmail	2014	7 day free trial, $4.99/month	20 GB	25 MB	English, German	Unlimited	?
Tuta	2011	Free (no ads) €36 year (Personal)	1 GB Free and Premium, 10 GB Teams; can be upgraded to 10 GB, 100 GB, or 1 TB	25 MB	30	Free: 1 Revolutionary: 15; Legend: 30	No
Yahoo! Mail	1997	Free (with ads); Yahoo! Mail Plus $49.99	15 GB (Note: Yahoo! Mail lowered its storage limit from 20 GB to 15 GB in 2026)	25 MB (150 MB per file via Dropbox)	27	Free: 3 Plus: 500	Yes
Yandex Mail	2000	Free (with ads) or paid options	5 GB	22 MB per file, total 30 MB per mail (2 GB per file via Yandex Disk)	10	?	Yes (Note: But doesn't delete them off the server automatically, in contrast to standard POP3 operation. See https://yandex.com/support/mail/mail-clients.html#pop3)
Zoho Mail	2008	Personal Free (no ads); Premium options $24 to $99/user yearly	From 5 GB up to 100 GB	20 MB free, 30 MB or 50 MB paid	16	?	Paid

== Supported protocols ==
Product	POP3 support	IMAP support	SMTP support	JMAP support	Cryptographic protocol support	IPv6 support	EAS support
AOL Mail	Yes	Yes	Yes	No	SSL	?	?
Fastmail	Yes	Yes	Yes	Yes	SSL, TLS	No	No
Gmail (Google Account)	Yes	Yes (Note: Requires the user to enable a specific settings in Gmail account ("less secure apps") or, for 2FA-enabled accounts, to generate and use a separate "application password".)	Yes	No	SSL, TLS	Yes	?
GMX Mail	Yes	Yes	Yes	No	SSL, TLS	No	?
HEY	No	No	No	No	TLS	No	No
Hushmail	Paid	Paid	Paid	No	SSL, TLS, OpenPGP	?	?
iCloud (Note: Must be an Apple (iPod, iPad, &c.) owner to obtain an account, but works on Windows, as well.)	No	Yes	Yes	No	SSL, TLS	No	?
Kolab Now	Yes	Yes	Yes	No	SSL, TLS	No	?
Lycos	Yes	Yes	Yes	No	SSL, TLS	?	?
Mail.com	Paid	Paid	?	No	SSL	No	?
Mail.ru	Yes	Yes	Yes	No	SSL, TLS	?	?
mailbox	Yes	Yes	Yes	No	?	?	?
Mailfence	Paid	Paid	Yes	No	SSL, TLS, OpenPGP	No	?
Outlook, Hotmail (Microsoft Account)	Yes	Yes	Yes	No	SSL, Exchange ActiveSync	Yes	?
Posteo	Yes	Yes	Yes	No	SSL, TLS	No	?
Proton Mail	Paid	Paid	No	No	SSL, TLS, OpenPGP, Tor	No	?
Rediffmail	Paid	Paid	?	No	SSL, TLS	?	?
StartMail	No	Yes	Yes	No	SSL, TLS, PFS	No	?
Tuta	No	No	No	No	SSL, DANE	No	?
Yahoo! Mail	Most countries or YPOPs!	Yes (Note: Also can be used on non-mobile devices via third-party software.)	Yes	No	SSL	No	?
Yandex Mail	Appears to require a phone number to enable IMAP	Yes	?	No	SSL, TLS	No	?
Zoho Mail	Paid	Paid	?	No	SSL	Partial	?

== Digital rights ==
=== Verification ===
How much information users must provide to verify and complete the registration when opening an account (green means less personal information requested):

Product	SMS verification	Secondary email verification
AOL Mail	Yes	Unknown
FastMail	Yes	No
Gmail	Optional (Note: Required only when you want 15 GB instead of 5GB)	Optional
GMX Mail (gmx.com)	Yes	No
Hushmail	Yes	Yes
iCloud	Unknown	Unknown
Laposte.net	Optional	Optional
Lycos	Yes	No
Mail.com	Yes	No
mailbox	No	No
Mail.ru	Yes	Unknown
Mailfence	No	Yes
Outlook.com	Not sure (Note: May required to be given. Currently mandatory verification is not enforced to everyone signing up but could be asked later on. When accessing microsoft account through outlook, it does ask for verification of at least one method. If not using microsoft but only outlook, then not required)	Not sure
Proton Mail	Optional (Note: Under normal circumstances email or sms verification is not required in Proton Mail. It may be required if trying to create multiple accounts, if using some Tor exit IPs, among other undisclosed factors.)	Optional
Rediffmail	Yes	Yes
Seznam.cz	Yes	Unknown
Tuta	No	No
Yahoo! Mail	Yes	No
Yandex Mail	Yes (Note: Yandex mail accounts can be created anonymously. However after approximately 2 months of usage all of a sudden on login Yandex says that your account seems to be hacked (which is not true), and in order to improve security you are not permitted to log in unless you provide a phone number.)	Unknown
Zoho Mail	Yes	Yes

=== Secure delivery ===
Features to reduce the risk of third-party tracking and interception of the email content; measures to increase the deliverability of correct outbound messages.

Product	Anti-interception			Outbound anti-spoofing and deliverability		Other (Note: Additional notes like usage of DMARC, ARC)
Product	STARTTLS (outbound) (Note: Ability to use STARTTLS over SMTP)	STARTTLS (inbound) (Note: Verified with https://starttls-everywhere.org/ or other)	Tracking content prevention	Basic SPF (Note: SPF is configured and outbound mail passes SPF test from default webmail and SMTP)	Default DKIM (Note: Outbound mail has a default DKIM signature by default)	Other
AOL Mail	No	?	?	?	?	?
FastMail	Yes	Yes	Yes	Yes	Yes	?
Gmail	Yes	Yes	Partial (only images) (Note: "Gmail uses a proxy to serve images in emails, the privacy tester reveals that using Gmail won't actually protect you from pixel tracking (though it will mask your IP address)")	Yes	Yes	Adds ARC, does not enforce DMARC rejection for Gmail.
GMX Mail (gmx.com)	?	?	?	Yes	?	?
Hushmail	?	?	?	?	?	?
iCloud (Note: Must be an Apple (iPod, iPad, &c.) owner to obtain an account, but works on Windows, as well.)	?	Yes	?	?	?	?
Laposte.net	?	?	?	?	?	?
Lycos	?	?	?	?	?	?
Mail.com	?	?	?	?	?	?
Mail.ru	?	Yes	?	?	?	?
mailbox	Yes	Yes	?	Yes	Yes	?
Mailfence	No	Yes	Yes	Yes	Yes	?
Outlook.com	Yes	Yes	Yes	?	?	Adds ARC
Proton Mail	?	?	Yes (images and pixel tracking)	Yes	?	?
Rediffmail	?	?	?	?	?	?
Tuta	?	?	?	Yes	?	?
Yahoo! Mail	No (yahoo.co.jp)	No (yahoo.co.jp)	?	Yes	?	DMARC policies incompatible with most mailing lists.
Yandex Mail	?	?	?	Yes	?	?
Zoho Mail	?	?	?	?	?	?

=== Other ===
Product	Verified privacy and legal defense (Note: This information can be verified by anyone with access to internet. Server locations play a role in an investigation and serve thereof for legal defense)							Verified (possibly) neutral technology		Claimed privacy policies (Note: Statement cannot be verified to be actual true as the information is handled by servers not accessed by the public)			Inactivity allowed
Product	Location	No username recycling	Fully free software webmail	Secure (TLS) webmail	Tor gateway available	Tor browser allowed (Note: It is possible that users cannot log in if they don't enable cookies or JavaScript for the Tor browser.)	Proxy gateway available	Internet censorship (countries)	HTTP tracking cookies	Personalized ads (Note: For services hosted by companies that also own web search engines: The results of ads are arranged for the user in accordance to his/her interests as determined from previous search queries or other information available to the search engine.)	Email tracking (Note: Tracking the user is not necessarily bad faith behaviour – it has to be conducted in order to provide personalized search results.)	Information sharing	Max inactivity (days)
AOL Mail	USA	Unknown	No	Yes (default)	No	Yes	Unknown	Unknown	Unknown	Yes	Yes	Yes	365
FastMail	USA / Australia	No	Partial (Roundcube option) (Note: Some parts of the FastMail web software have been released as free, open-source software. The front-end JavaScript library is released as Overture JS and the rich-text editor as Squire. The data model and various client code was donated to Roundcube for its JMAP implementation.)	Yes (default)	No	Yes	Yes	Unknown	Unknown	No	Unknown	Unknown	Unknown
Gmail	USA	Yes	No (HTML option, requires proprietary JavaScript for ReCAPTCHA)	Yes (default)	No	Requires Tor users to confirm their identity with SMS	No	Unknown	Yes	Yes	Yes	Yes	730
GMX Mail (gmx.com)	Germany	Unknown	No	Yes	No	Yes	Unknown	Unknown	Unknown	Unknown	No	Unknown	180
Hushmail	Canada	Unknown	No	Yes (default)	No	Yes (2012)	Unknown	Unknown	Unknown	No	Unknown	No	Unknown
iCloud (Note: Must be an Apple (iPod, iPad, &c.) owner to obtain an account, but works on Windows, as well.)	USA	Unknown	No	Yes (default)	No	Unknown	Unknown	Unknown	Unknown	Unknown	Unknown	Unknown	Unknown
Laposte.net	France	Unknown	No	Yes	No	Unknown	Unknown	No	Unknown	Unknown	Unknown	Unknown	Unknown
Lycos	Korea	Unknown	No	Yes	No	Unknown	Unknown	Unknown	Unknown	Unknown	Unknown	Unknown	Unknown
Mail.com	USA / Germany	Unknown	No	Yes	No	Yes	Unknown	Unknown	Unknown	Unknown	Unknown	Unknown	365
Mail.ru	Russia	Unknown	No	Yes (default)	No	Yes	Unknown	Unknown	Unknown	Unknown	Unknown	Unknown	515
mailbox	Germany	No	Yes	Yes (default)	Yes	Yes	No	No	No	No	No	No	30 (after contract termination)
Mailfence	Belgium	Unknown	No	Yes (default)	No	Yes	Yes	No	No	No	No	No	365 (free), forever (paid)
Outlook.com	USA	Yes	No	Yes (default)	No	Requires Tor users to confirm their identity with SMS	Unknown	Unknown	Unknown	No	Yes	Yes	365
Posteo	Germany	Unknown	Yes (Roundcube)	Yes (default)	Unknown	Unknown	Unknown	Unknown	Unknown	Unknown	Unknown	Unknown	Unknown
Proton Mail	Switzerland	Yes	Yes	Yes (default)	Yes	Yes	No	Russia	No	No	No	No (blocked in Russia)	365 (free), forever (paid)
Rediffmail	India	Unknown	No	Yes	No	Yes	Unknown	Unknown	Unknown	Unknown	Unknown	Unknown	Unknown
Tuta	Germany	Yes	Yes (GPLv3)	Yes (default)	No	Yes	No	Russia	No	No	No	No (blocked in Russia)	180
Yahoo! Mail	USA	No	No	Yes (default)	No	Yes	Unknown	Unknown	Unknown	Yes	Yes	Yes	365
Yandex Mail	Russia	Unknown	No	Yes (default)	No	Yes	Unknown	Unknown	Unknown	Yes	Yes	Unknown	912
Zoho Mail	USA / India	Unknown	No	Yes	No	Unknown	Unknown	Unknown	Unknown	No	Unknown	Unknown	270

== Unique features ==
Unique features in webmail products
Name	Features
FastMail	Spam filter; backscatter detection; deletion of selected attachments. Android and iPhone apps; Official MCP server.
Gmail	Account verification via SMS or voice call in some countries; "Normal" view via Settings; Labels instead of folders; Undo send (implemented as a delayed send)
Laposte.net	spam filter, deletion of selected attachments, address book and calendar/agenda, import/export features for mails, contacts and calendar events, custom signatures for each alias, filters (custom rules) for organizing your emails, holiday mode (auto-response), mobile app for smartphones, integration with Digiposte (a virtual safe-deposit box that allows you to safely archive all your documents in a secured place, including legal documents).
Mailfence	Client-side encryption with email expiration, Digital signatures, Full OpenPGP inter-operability and support, Integrated account keystore, Multiple PGP keypair support, Public keyserver connection, Full reversibility and key revocation, Full email-suite, Shared mailbox and collaboration with group members
Outlook.com	One-time password, Mobile alerts, Account verification via SMS or voice call in some countries, Rules, Scheduled Cleanup, Filter to e.g. only see newsletters or Emails from contacts, Recover deleted emails; Key encryption for paid accounts
Proton Mail	Client-side encryption, email expiration, automatic encryption for Proton Mail-Proton Mail emails, optional email encryption for messages from Proton Mail to other providers
Rediffmail	sign-in via Google, Yahoo!, Facebook, Twitter, Mobile Sync; Indrive.
Tuta	Client-side encryption, automatic encryption of mailbox, automatic encryption of emails between Tuta users, optional email encryption for messages from Tuta to other providers
Yandex Mail	Email for own domains (Yandex PDD), scheduled email delivery, SMS verification, sign-in via Twitter, VK, Facebook, Google Profile
Zoho Mail	Email Sharing, Folder Sharing, Collaborating with other users by Chat/ Social media for organization, Filters, Schedule and send emails, reminders, Notes, Tasks, Bookmarks and so on.

== Features ==
Service Name	Automatic forwarding	Email client access (Note: Most mail services that do not support POP3 access can be accessed through the FreePOPs mail proxy software.)	Client email for other server	Integration with IM service	Domain Name customization	Interface script technique	Virus scanning	Filters out emails with executable attachments	Custom "From:" Address	Address modifiers (subaddressing)	Server hosted public keyring (for encryption)	Shared key encryption	Zero-knowledge architecture
AOL Mail	No	Yes (POP3, IMAP, SMTP)	Yes (Note: Through AOL Easy Transfer)	AOL Instant Messenger	No (Note: Through AOL My eAddress)	JavaScript/ Ajax	Yes (McAfee)	No	Yes	?	No	No	No
FastMail	Yes	Yes (POP3, IMAP, SMTP)	Yes (POP3 only)	No (XMPP until 2016-01-31)	Some paid plans only	HTML/ JavaScript/ CSS/AJAX	Yes	Configurable with user filtering rules	Yes	Plus addressing and subdomain addressing	No	No	No
Gmail	Yes	Yes (POP3, IMAP); SSL/TLS supported SMTP restricted (Note: Gmail restricts the FROM field to registered addresses. e.g. Disposable addresses forbidden.)	No	Google Talk^{beta} (XMPP), AOL Instant Messenger	Via Google Workspace, premium plans only	HTML/ JavaScript/ AJAX (Note: HTML interface available for legacy browsers or users with JavaScript disabled.)	Yes	Yes, including .exe files in zip files	Yes, limited. Feature restricted to preconfigured addresses. Addresses not registered in advance with Gmail are blocked.	Plus addressing	No	No	No
Hushmail	Business accounts only	Extra cost (Note: IMAP access available for $14.99 for the first year and $29.99 yearly thereafter.)	?	No	Business accounts only	HTML/ JavaScript/ AJAX	Yes	?	Yes, unlimited email aliases for paid subscribers	No	Yes	Yes	No
iCloud	?	POP, IMAP, SMTP; SSL/TLS supported	?	?	iCloud+ subscribers only	?	Yes	?	?	Plus addressing	?	?	No
Laposte.net	No	Yes (POP3, IMAP, SMTP) SSL/TLS supported	Yes (POP3, IMAP) SSL/TLS supported	No	No	user can choose between HTML or Ajax	Yes	?	Yes (max. 6 alias per email account)	No	No	No	No
Mail.com	Premium accounts only	Premium plans only (POP, IMAP, SMTP; SSL/TLS supported)	Yes (POP3 only)	Google Talk (XMPP)	No	HTML/ JavaScript/ AJAX^{2}	Yes	Yes, including .exe files in zip files	Yes	No	No	No	No
Mail.ru	Yes	Yes (POP3, IMAP)	Yes (POP3, IMAP)	ICQ, Custom	Yes (Free, Mail.ru for Business supports up to 5000 mailboxes)	HTML/ AJAX (Beta)	Yes (Kaspersky)	?	Yes	?	No	No	No
Mailfence	Paying accounts only	Paying accounts only (SMTP, POP3, IMAP, Exchange ActiveSync), DAVx supported	Yes	XMPP (Note: Mailfence provides an internal Instant Messaging feature for group members.)	Paying accounts only	HTML/ AJAX	Yes	Yes, including .exe files in zip files	Paying accounts only	Plus addressing	Yes	Yes	No
Outlook.com	Yes	Yes (POP3, SMTP, IMAP, Microsoft Exchange Server)	No (No POP3, but Gmail sync allowed for paid customers)	Skype, Google Hangouts, Facebook Chat	Via Office 365, some premium plans only	HTML/ JavaScript/ CSS/AJAX	Yes	Yes, including .exe files in zip files	Yes	Plus addressing	Via Office 365	Via Office 365	No
Proton Mail	No	Premium plans only through Proton Mail Bridge	No	No	Premium plans only	JavaScript/AJAX	Yes (ClamAV)	No	Yes	Plus addressing	Yes	Yes	Yes
rediff	No	Premium plans only	?	Rediff Bol	Yes	JavaScript/ AJAX^{2}	Yes	?	Yes	?	No	No	No
Seznam.cz	Yes	Yes (POP3, IMAP, SMTP); SSL/TLS supported	Yes (POP3 only)	No	Yes	HTML/ JavaScript	Yes (ESET-NOD32)	?	Yes	?	No	No	No
Tutanota	No	No	?	No	Premium plans only	JavaScript	No	No	Yes	No	Yes	Yes	Yes
Yahoo! Mail	Premium plan only (Note: Yahoo! Mail had automatic forwarding available to all accounts prior to January 15, 2021.)	POP3-Plus members only, but free in some countries, IMAP; SSL/TLS supported	Yes (POP3 only)	Yahoo! Messenger	Premium plan only	HTML/ JavaScript/ CSS/AJAX	Yes (Norton AntiVirus)	Yes, including .exe files in zip files	Yes & only 10 addresses	Plus addressing (using "-" only)	No	No	No
Yandex Mail	Yes	Yes (POP3, IMAP, SMTP, SSL)	Yes (POP3 only)	Ya Online, any XMPP IM	Yes (Free, Yandex PDD supports up to 1000 mailboxes without verification of legal use)	HTML/ JavaScript/ CSS/AJAX	Yes (Dr.Web)	Configurable or/and if discarded by antivirus	Yes, only from confirmed addresses	Plus addressing	No	No	No
Zoho Mail	Yes if you use Zoho domain, if you use your own domain then Premium plans only	Premium plans only (POP, IMAP, SMTP)	Yes (POP)	XMPP, Google Talk, AOL Instant Messenger, ICQ, Yahoo! Messenger	Business plans only, including free plan	AJAX	Yes	?	Yes	Plus addressing	No	No	No

== See also ==
- Comparison of web search engines - often merged with webmail by companies that host both services
- Comparison of email clients - apps that run on an operating system (OS)
