= Oddpost =

Defunct webmail service

Oddpost was a pay-for webmail service that debuted in April 4, 2002. It pioneered the use of JavaScript to mimic a desktop mail application, the first notable foray into using Ajax methodologies for webmail. Ajax techniques minimized the amount of data sent during an email session by sending "Datapacks" instead of reloading the whole interface on every click like a traditional webmail service (Hotmail, AOL). This made the service much faster, at the time, than its counterparts.

== History ==
Oddpost created an interface much like the traditional 3-pane view used by many desktop software applications (namely Microsoft Outlook, Apple's Mail, Microsoft Entourage, Mozilla Thunderbird, and others). Oddpost also had the design philosophy of making the interface invisible, where unread message headers were bolded, so there was no need for an unread message icon next to each message; sub folders were indented under the parent, so there was no need for a little ant trail connecting each folder.

This excerpt from a 2003 interview with Ethan Diamond, Oddpost's co-founder and then president, explained this minimalist approach:

This data-centric approach may sound painfully obvious, but consider that at 1024×768 (the most common resolution on the web), only about 30% of Yahoo! Mail’s inbox screen is devoted to your mail. The remaining 70% is not, as you might expect, all devoted to advertising. In fact, ads only account for about 10% of the screen real estate, and the remaining 60% is consumed by navigation, dead space and administrative debris.

Google made extensive use of these ideas in Gmail, which was launched two years later.

Oddpost was also known for its humorous blog entries about feature additions, bug fixes, and random musings about Oddpost.

Some disadvantages of Oddpost were seen to be that it required Windows and Internet Explorer, and that it lacked mail filters and support for secure email.

Oddpost was purchased by Yahoo! on July 9, 2004, and became the new version of their Yahoo! Mail service. On September 14, 2005, Yahoo! Mail started letting some users register to beta test the new Yahoo! Mail web client.

The original Oddpost servers have been shut down, however existing Oddpost customers were able to keep their Oddpost email addresses to be used with Yahoo!.
