= Boxbe =

Email spam filtering service

- Founded: 2005; 21 years ago
- Founders: Thede Loder; Corbett Barr
- Website: boxbe.com

Boxbe is a free service that prioritizes and screens spam in personal email. Users can select which email they want to receive, and which email goes to spam. It presents a challenge to the sender that requires a human response. Bulk anonymous data is provided to their parent company, which provides an email validation and tracking service.

== Service ==
Boxbe starts with the user allowing Boxbe access to all of the user's email contacts. Boxbe then gives priority to contacts that users allow. Integration within Gmail (including Google Apps), AOL, Yahoo! Mail and their affiliates lets Boxbe stay up to date so it can screen email.

== History ==
Boxbe was founded in 2005 by Thede Loder and Corbett Barr. Venture capital firm Draper Fisher Jurvetson and Esther Dyson were both investors, with Dyson and Steve Jurvetson serving as board members. As a way to filter spam beyond challenge response, Boxbe initially used the option of allowing recipients to define a price that senders must risk to deliver the initial message (paying a fee to deliver the email, which they called the Attention Bond Mechanism), which they later abandoned. Boxbe company founder Thede Loder along with Marshall Van Alstyne and Rick Wash wrote the initial paper on Attention Bond Mechanism. Technically capable users can assemble many of these functions, such as whitelisting.

== Acquisition ==
In 2012, eDataSource, Inc. purchased the assets of Boxbe, Inc.

== See also ==
- Comparison of email services
