= AOL Mail =

Free web-based email service provided by AOL

- A screenshot of AOL Mail inbox in January 2014.
- Website type: Web application (E-mail, webmail)
- Available in: 54 languages
- Founded: 1993
- Owner: AOL
- Website: mail.aol.com
- Commercial: No
- Registration: Requires
- Current status: Online
- Content license: Proprietary

AOL Mail is a free web-based email service provided by AOL.

== Features ==
AOL Mail offers a variety of features designed to enhance the user experience. Users can send email attachments up to 25 MB in size, and while the maximum mailbox size is technically unlimited, new accounts typically come with a 1 TB storage cap. The service supports standard email protocols including POP3, SMTP, IMAP, allowing for integration with a wide range of email clients.

AOL Mail also allows users to link their accounts to other email services, such as Gmail and Hotmail, for centralized email management. However, advertisements are displayed while using the service. Additionally, any embedded links within received emails are disabled by default for security purposes and can only be activated manually by the user.

Security features include built-in spam and virus protection, as well as support for secure connections via TLS/HTTPS after login. The platform also offers a spell-checking feature to assist with email composition.

AOL email addresses use the @aol.com domain; however, in the past, users could also create addresses with domains such as @love.com, @ygm.com (short for "you've got mail"), @games.com, and @wow.com.

If an AOL Mail account remains inactive for 12 months, it may be deleted.

== History ==
In 1993, both America Online (AOL) and Delphi started connecting their proprietary e-mail services to the Internet.

As of October 1997, AOL Mail was the world's largest e-mail provider, with around 9 million subscribers (identical with the number of AOL subscribers).

In 1997, AOL launched NetMail, a web-based version of its e-mail service. It was initially criticized for only working on Internet Explorer, but a later Java-written version ensured compatibility with Netscape Navigator. The service was renamed AOL Mail on the Web in December 1999.

In January 2001, an e-mail alert service for text-based digital cellphones and pagers was launched.

In 2004, AOL tested a new free webmail service for the public, without the need of customers subscribing to AOL. This was done in an effort to compete better against MSN Hotmail, Yahoo! Mail and Gmail. The service launched in May 2005 under the name AIM Mail, with 2 gigabytes of mail storage and tightly integrated with AOL Instant Messenger (AIM). It is based on technology from MailBlocks, which AOL acquired in 2004.

From August 2006, AOL became entirely free of charge for broadband users. The same month, Netscape Mail was migrated to AIM Mail.

In November 2010, AOL released Project Phoenix, an email application program that features a Quick Bar where emails, text messages, and AOL Instant Messenger messages can be sent from one area. It also lets people add up to five accounts into it. In 2012, AOL released the Alto Mail software.

As of July 2012, there were 24 million AOL Mail users. By 2021, the number of paying users had dropped to 1.5 million.

On March 16, 2017, Verizon, which had acquired AOL in 2015, announced that it would discontinue its in-house email services for internet subscribers, and migrate all customers to AOL Mail.

== See also ==
- Comparison of webmail providers
- Gmail
- Outlook.com
- Yahoo! Mail
