= FreePOPs =

Mail proxy software

- Original authors: Caprari, Cocchiaro, Russell Schwager, Tassi, and Vellei
- Initial release: 30 April 2004
- Stable release: 0.2.9 / 27 December 2008; 17 years ago
- Operating system: Windows, Linux, Mac OS X, BeOS
- Platform: Cross-platform
- Available in: C, Lua
- Type: E-mail
- License: GNU General Public License
- Website: freepops.sourceforge.net

FreePOPs is an extensible mail proxy that allows checking and downloading of e-mail from webmails using any conventional POP3 client program, avoiding the need to use a Web browser. It can also be used as an aggregator for RSS feeds. The application retrieves messages from various accounts (e.g. Gmail, Yahoo! Mail, Hotmail, AOL) without manual login through an http page.

FreePOPs is a POP3 daemon with a Lua interpreter and some extra libraries for HTTP and HTML parsing. Its main purpose is translating local POP3 requests (from a local e-mail client for example) to remote HTTP actions on the supported webmails, but it can also be used to receive news from a website as if they were e-mail messages in a mailbox. Most plugins work by screen scraping the target website.

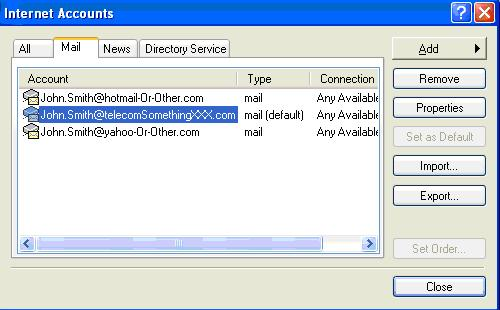
Example with various accounts using FreePOPs
