= Hushmail =

Web-based encrypted mail service

- Website type: Webmail
- Headquarters: Vancouver, British Columbia, Canada
- Owner: Hush Communications Ltd
- Creator: Cliff Baltzley
- Website: Hushmail.com
- Commercial: Yes
- Registration: Required
- Launched: 1999
- Current status: Online
- Content license: Proprietary

Hushmail is an encrypted proprietary web-based email service offering PGP-encrypted e-mail and vanity domain service. Hushmail uses OpenPGP standards. If public encryption keys are available to both recipient and sender (either both are Hushmail users or have uploaded PGP keys to the Hush keyserver), Hushmail can convey authenticated, encrypted messages in both directions.

For recipients for whom no public key is available, Hushmail will allow a message to be encrypted by a password (with a password hint) and stored for pickup by the recipient, or the message can be sent in cleartext. In July 2016, the company launched an iOS app that offers end-to-end encryption and full integration with the webmail settings. The company is located in Vancouver, British Columbia, Canada.

== History ==
Hushmail was founded by Cliff Baltzley in 1999 after he left Ultimate Privacy.

== Accounts ==
=== Individuals ===
There is one type of paid account, Hushmail for Personal Use, which provides 10GB of storage, as well as IMAP and POP3 service.

=== Businesses ===
The standard business account provides the same features as the paid individual account, plus other features like vanity domain, email forwarding, catch-all email, user admin, archive, and Business Associate Agreements for healthcare plans. Features like secure forms and electronic signatures are available in specific plans.

Additional security features include hidden IP addresses in e-mail headers, two-step verification and HIPAA-compliant encryption.

=== Instant messaging ===
An instant messaging service, Hush Messenger, was offered until July 1, 2011.

== Compromises to email privacy ==
Hushmail received favorable reviews in the press. It was believed that possible threats, such as demands from the legal system to reveal the content of traffic through the system, were not imminent in Canada – unlike the United States – and that if data were to be handed over, encrypted messages would be available only in encrypted form.

Developments in November 2007 led to doubts amongst security-conscious users about Hushmail's security – specifically, concern over a backdoor. The issue originated with the non-Java version of the Hush system. It performed the encrypt/decrypt steps on Hush's servers, and then used SSL to transmit the data to the user. The data is available as cleartext during this small window of time, with the passphrase being capturable at this point, facilitating the decryption of all stored messages and future messages using this passphrase. Hushmail stated that the Java version is also vulnerable, in that they may be compelled to deliver a compromised Java applet to a user.

Hushmail supplied cleartext copies of private email messages associated with several addresses at the request of law enforcement agencies under a Mutual Legal Assistance Treaty with the United States: e.g. in the case of United States v. Stumbo. In addition, the contents of emails between Hushmail addresses were analyzed, and 12 CDs were supplied to U.S. authorities. Hushmail privacy policy states that it logs IP addresses in order "to analyze market trends, gather broad demographic information, and prevent abuse of our services."

Hush Communications, the company that provides Hushmail, states that it will not release any user data without a court order from the Supreme Court of British Columbia, Canada and that other countries seeking access to user data must apply to the government of Canada via an applicable Mutual Legal Assistance Treaty. Hushmail states, "...that means that there is no guarantee that we will not be compelled, under a court order issued by the Supreme Court of British Columbia, Canada, to treat a user named in a court order differently, and compromise that user's privacy" and "[...]if a court order has been issued by the Supreme Court of British Columbia compelling us to reveal the content of your encrypted email, the "attacker" could be Hush Communications, the actual service provider."

== See also ==
- Comparison of mail servers
- Comparison of webmail providers
