= Mailvelope =

Browser extension for OpenPGP encryption with webmail services

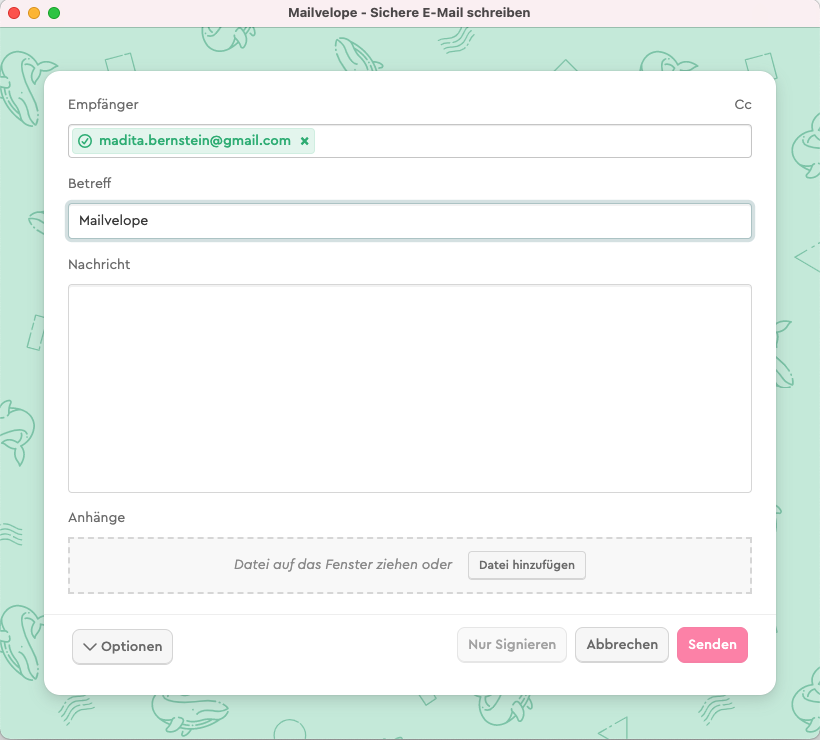
- Mailvelope editor
- Developer: Mailvelope GmbH
- Initial release: 2012; 14 years ago
- Stable release: 5.1.1 / 13 October 2023; 2 years ago
- Written in: JavaScript
- Platform: web browser
- Type: browser extension
- License: AGPL (free software)
- Website: www.mailvelope.com
- Repository: mailvelope on GitHub

Mailvelope is free software for end-to-end encryption of email traffic inside of a web browser (Firefox, Chromium or Edge) that integrates itself into existing webmail applications ("email websites"). It can be used to encrypt and sign electronic messages, including attached files, without the use of a separate, native email client (like Thunderbird) using the OpenPGP standard.

The name is a portmanteau of the words "mail" and "envelope". It is published together with its source code under the terms of version 3 of the GNU Affero General Public License (AGPL). The company Mailvelope GmbH runs the development using a public code repository on GitHub. Development is sponsored by the Open Technology Fund and Internews.

Similar alternatives had been Mymail-Crypt and WebPG.

== Features ==
Mailvelope equips webmail applications with OpenPGP functionality. Support for several popular providers like Gmail, Yahoo, Outlook on the web and others are preconfigured. The webmail software Roundcube senses and supports Mailvelope as of version 1.2 from May 2016, as well as most (self-hosted) webmail clients. For Chromium/Chrome there's the possibility to install from an authenticated source using the integrated software extension manager "Chrome Web Store". In addition, Mailvelope is also available for Firefox and Microsoft Edge as an add-on.

Mailvelope works according to the OpenPGP standard, a public-key cryptosystem first standardized in 1998 and is written in JavaScript. On preset or user-authorized web pages it overlays the page with its control elements, which are optically distinguished as being separate from the web application by a surrounding security-background. This background can be customized to detect impersonations. For encryption it relies on the functionality of the program library OpenPGP.js, a free JavaScript Implementation of the OpenPGP standard. By running inside a separate inline frame, its code is executed separately from the web application and should prevent it from accessing clear text message contents.

The integration of Mailvelope via an API, developed in collaboration with United Internet, allows deeper integration between the webmail service and Mailvelope components. Thus, the setup and generation of a key pair can be done directly in the webmailer using a wizard. Mailvelope manages all OpenPGP keys locally in the browser. Since version 3.0, a local GnuPG installation can be included in Mailvelope's key management, allowing users to use native applications if desired.

== History and usage ==
Thomas Oberndörfer started developing Mailvelope in spring 2012 with the first public version 0.4.0.1 released on August 24. The global surveillance disclosure raised questions about the security of private and business email communication. At the time, e-mail encryption with OpenPGP was considered too complicated to use. Moreover, the webmail services that were particularly popular with private individuals did not offer any end-to-end encryption functions. This led to various mentions of Mailvelope in the press as a possible solution to this problem.

Mario Heiderich and Krzysztof Kotowicz of Cure53 did a security audit on an alpha version from 2012/2013. Among other things, the separation from the web application and its data structures was improved based on its findings. In February 2014, the same group analysed the library OpenPGP.js which Mailvelope is based on. Version 0.8.0, released the following April, adopted the resulting fixes and added support for message signing. In May 2014, iSEC Partners published an analysis of the Firefox extension. Version 1.0.0 was published on August 18, 2015.

In April 2015, De-Mail providers equipped their services with a default disabled option for end-to-end encryption based on Mailvelope, but it could only be used in combination with Mobile TAN or the German electronic identity card. The new version of the extension was released in May 2015. In August 2015, the email services of Web.de and GMX introduced support for OpenPGP encryption and integrated Mailvelope into their webmail applications for that. According to the company's own information, this option to encrypt e-mails in this way was available to around 30 million users.

A 2015 study examined the usability of Mailvelope as an example of a modern OpenPGP client and deemed it unsuitable for the masses. They recommended integrating assistant functionality, sending instructive invitation messages to new communication partners, and publishing basic explanatory texts. The Mailvelope-based OpenPGP system of United Internet integrates such functionality and its usability earned some positive mentions in the press, particularly the offered key synchronization feature. A usability analysis from 2016 found it to still be "worthy of improvement" ("verbesserungswürdig"), though, and mentioned "confusing wording" ("irritierende Formulierungen"), missing communication of the concept, bad password recommendations, missing negative dissociation of the more prominent modus that features only transport encryption, plus insufficient support for key authenticity checking (to thwart man-in-the-middle attacks).

Mailvelope was enhanced in 2018/19 as part of a BSI initiative. Overall, the "key management was simplified, and security of the software improved." All security vulnerabilities in the Mailvelope source code, as well as in the OpenPGP.js program library used, brought to light by a security audit conducted by SEC Consult were closed. According to the BSI, one goal of the project was also to enable website operators to offer contact forms in the future to securely encrypt messages from the user's browser to the recipient. The import of new keys would be HTTPS-encrypted using the WKD (Web Key Directory) protocol.
