= Jack Smith (Hotmail) =

Founder of Outlook.com (Hotmail)

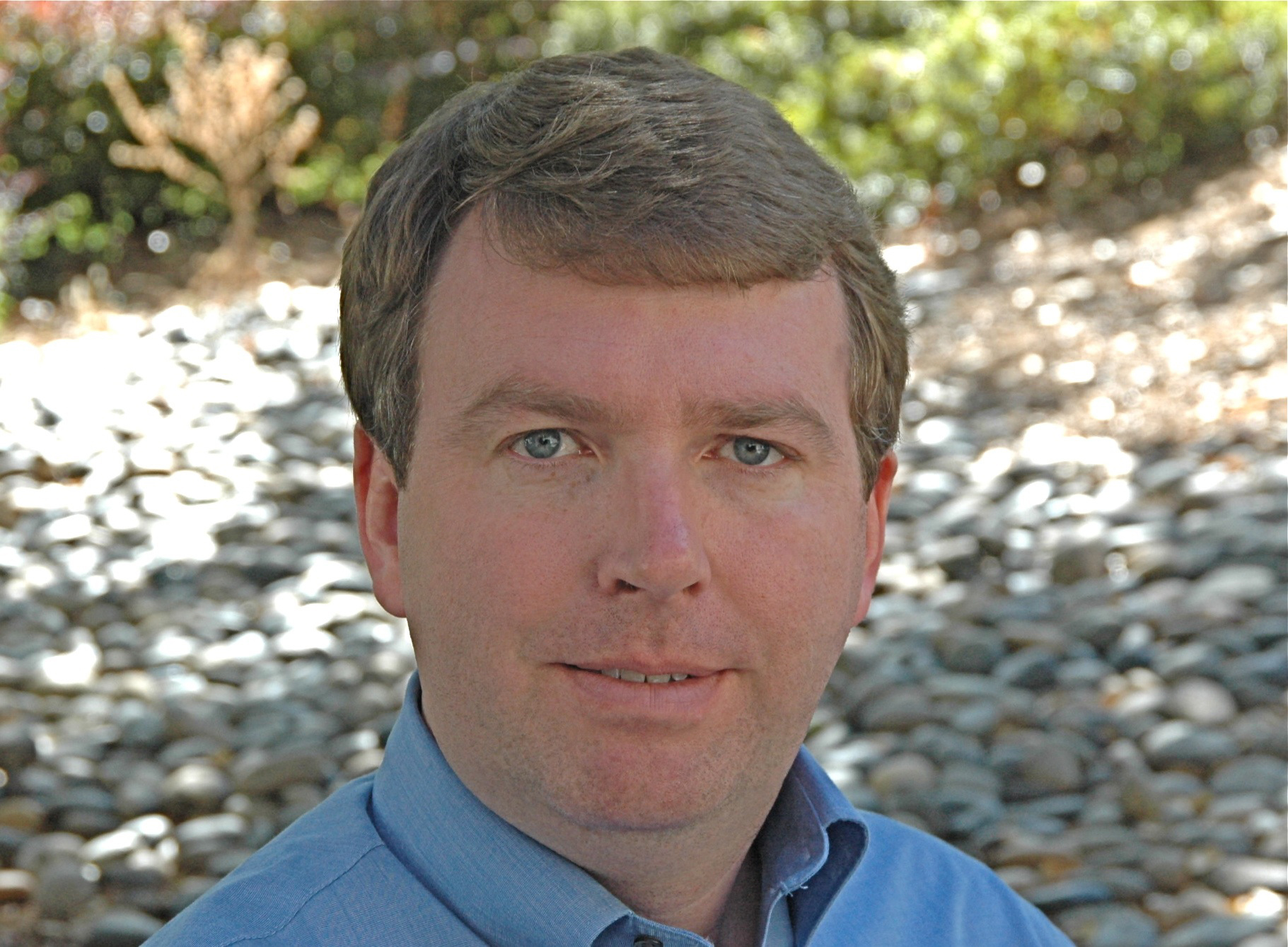
- 2011
- Born: c. 1968 (age 57–58)
- Occupation: CEO of Verifyle
- Known for: Co-founding Hotmail.com

Jack Smith is an American entrepreneur, businessman and engineer who co-founded the first free web-based email service, Hotmail.com in 1996.

== Career ==
Jack Smith worked at FirePower Systems Inc., a subsidiary of Canon Inc., where he designed integrated circuits for use in high performance PowerPC workstations, and invented and marketed the first web server accelerator card that boosted server performance significantly.

Later on at Apple Computer, he worked on several of Apple's early PowerBook computers.

He has been the founder and president of EEE.com, building custom Internet web solutions.

Smith came up with the idea for anonymous web-based email in 1995, and worked with Sabeer Bhatia, his colleague at Apple, to found the company. The company opened on July 4, 1996, with Smith as its chief technology officer.

In December 1997, Bhatia sold Hotmail to Microsoft for a reported $400 million. Smith joined Microsoft as part of the acquisition and served as a Director of Engineering of Microsoft, first heading its Hotmail engineering division, and then leading a team developing next generation Internet software infrastructure.

Smith went on to co-found Akamba Corporation and work as its CEO.

In 2007 he was named CEO of Proximex, a physical security information management software provider. Since 2015, Smith has been CEO of Verifyle.
