= Kolab Now =

Web-based email and groupware service

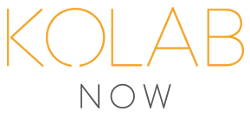
- Website type: Webmail, groupware
- Available in: English, German, French
- Owner: Apheleia IT AG
- Website: kolabnow.com
- Commercial: Yes
- Registration: Required
- Launched: January 2013; 13 years ago
- Current status: Online
- Content licence: Free, open-source

Kolab Now is a web-based email and groupware service, based completely on free and open-source software. It is owned and operated by Kolab Systems AG and was formerly known as MyKolab.

== Kolab ==
Kolab Systems AG is the company behind the Kolab groupware suite. Founded in 2010 in Zürich, Switzerland, Kolab Systems has taken the place of the Kolab Konsortium which initially provided Kolab services primarily in German speaking areas from 2004 to 2010. It is also the largest contributor to the Roundcube web mailer project. The company's board of directors is composed of CEO Georg Greve, the founding president of Free Software Foundation Europe, CTO Jeroen van Meeuwen, Michael Moser, CCO and co-founder of Switzerlands leading Open Source Integrator Adfinis AG, and Philipp Koch, co-founder of Swiss hosting company Nine.ch.

== Background ==
Kolab Now, under the original name "MyKolab", was launched in January 2013 as a public beta release and became fully available later that year on August 1, as a paid service.

After documents detailing United States and British government mass surveillance programs like PRISM and Tempora were leaked by Edward Snowden in May 2013, US-based companies Lavabit and Silent Circle, under pressure of government agencies, decided to shut down their email services rather than run the risk of having to disclose personal data of their users. In turn, Pamela Jones, author of now-defunct legal site Groklaw, revealed her use of MyKolab in her farewell post. Jones' endorsement increased demand for MyKolab.

Based outside of the United States, Kolab Systems received media attention as one of the few and most secure alternatives still in operation.

== Privacy of customer data ==
Hosted in Switzerland, Kolab Now claims the benefit of strict privacy laws; it uses exclusively free or open source software, guaranteeing transparency. Because the service is subject to the national laws of Switzerland, Kolab Now states that there will be no access to a user's data by third parties without a duly authorized warrant issued by a Swiss judge. It is also stated in the terms of service that only the minimum of logs, necessary for debugging and improvement of the service, is kept.

=== Requests from government agencies ===
Like any company, Kolab Now can be obliged to provide access to lawful interception requests. However, the Swiss authorities are generally reluctant to make such requests for access, and the government publishes anonymised statistics of all such lawful interceptions along with the rationale.

As of 1 September 2015, Kolab Now reports having granted only one request from a government agency for data concerning a customer, and they note that this was an "administrative request", i.e. a request for information about a customer rather than a request for access to the customer's data. Kolab Now received two further requests but denied them because they came from an agency with no jurisdiction in Switzerland (both were from U.S. local police).

In 2012, in all of Switzerland, there were only 20 cases of real-time internet wire-tapping and a further 26 for retroactive communication meta-information. Swiss Federal Intelligence Service traditionally have no mandate to operate within the country. A controversial revision of the law, effective 1 September 2017, has recently given them wider license, in particular wholesale monitoring of cross-border traffic. According to Kolab Now, not much will change for its customers, however.

== Email encryption ==
Kolab Now chose not to provide server-side encryption, and recommends using Kontact or Mozilla Thunderbird with Enigmail for proper end-to-end encryption. With server-side encryption, the encrypted data, the key, and the passphrase would need to pass through the web interface and be available on the server. Holding all three, the provider would have access to all the data despite the encryption.

== Account types ==
Kolab Now offers 2 types of accounts: Individual and Group manager accounts.

=== Individual account ===
It is aimed at the individual who wishes a more secure and private alternative to free email services, with full groupware functionality. There's the option of a Lite version, which offers the email service only and do not include the groupware synchronisation feature. Standard storage size for this account type ranges from 2 up to 100 GB, with cost incurring accordingly.

=== Group Manager account ===
This account type provides the customer with an administration login, used purely to set up the actual groupware account within a domain under the customer's control, and to administrate users existing within that domain. It is also possible to use an own SSL Certificate for that domain. Cost is incurred per user in a similar fashion to the individual accounts.

== Features ==
=== Synchronisation with mobile devices ===
The ActiveSync option allows to synchronize emails, contacts, events and tasks from Kolab Now to a mobile device. This works with all devices that support ActiveSync, such as Android, iPhone or Blackberry Z10. Alternatively, it is possible to use CalDAV and CardDAV capable clients to synchronise data.

=== Native desktop client for all platforms ===
The Kolab Client runs on all modern operating systems such as Linux, Windows and MacOS. It supports different applications such as Mail, Address Books, Calendars, ToDo Management, Journals, Notes and offers many detailed features for each of them. It is based on Kontact and uses the Qt Technology to be fully portable.

=== Server-side mail filtering ===
It is possible to define the criteria for emails to be filtered into different mail folders. The filtering will happen on the server right after the mail is received. This way emails are the same on all devices. Users can edit the filters as SIEVE scripts directly.

=== Free/Busy Information for Planning ===
Allows to see whether the participants of events are free or busy without revealing any information about what they are doing during these times. This allows to schedule appointments and ensure that everybody is able to participate.

Other available features:

- Threaded mailview
- Task management
- File storage
- Customisable webclient
- Set up multiple identities
- Multiple calendar folders and views

== Payment and pricing ==
Kolab Now currently supports PayPal and Bitcoin as well as credit card as payment methods for monthly subscriptions and wire transfer for yearly payments only. The current monthly price for individual accounts with standard groupware functionality is 8.99 CHF, and for the email-only version, 4.55 CHF.

== Controversies ==
In 2015, Kolab Systems, now known as Apheleia IT AG, collected approximately US$103,000 through crowdfunding to modernise the Roundcube email client as "Roundcube Next". However, the work was never completed. Thomas Bruederli, the maintainer of the crowdfunding project, has blocked requests for information about the project's status.

== See also ==
- Comparison of mail servers
- Comparison of webmail providers
