= Alto Mail =

Multi-service email client and proprietary email intelligence engine

- Screenshot
- Developer: Oath Inc.
- Release: October 18, 2012; 13 years ago
- Platform: Android, iOS, Web
- Available in: 12 languages
- Type: Email client
- Website: altomail.com (Mobile) web.altomail.com (Web)

Alto Mail was a multi-service email client and proprietary email intelligence engine built to analyze and restructure incoming emails and calendar events by Oath Inc. It supported IMAP email providers like Gmail, Outlook, Yahoo, iCloud, and AOL Mail, as well as email providers using Microsoft Exchange. The centerpiece of the Alto email app was the Dashboard, which acted as a hub where information from multiple inboxes and integrated Calendars was displayed. The information was analyzed and then delivered in the forms of “Cards”, which allowed users to view snapshots of important emails and events ranging from travel details to shopping information, as well as mapping and ride service support for upcoming calendar events. Alto Mail had integration with other popular productivity technology such as Slack, and the Amazon Echo, providing Alexa support for linked accounts.

On October 25, 2017, Oath announced that Alto Mail would be discontinued, with the distribution of the mobile apps ending on November 9, 2017, and support for the apps ending on December 10, 2017.
