= Mailfence =

Encrypted email service

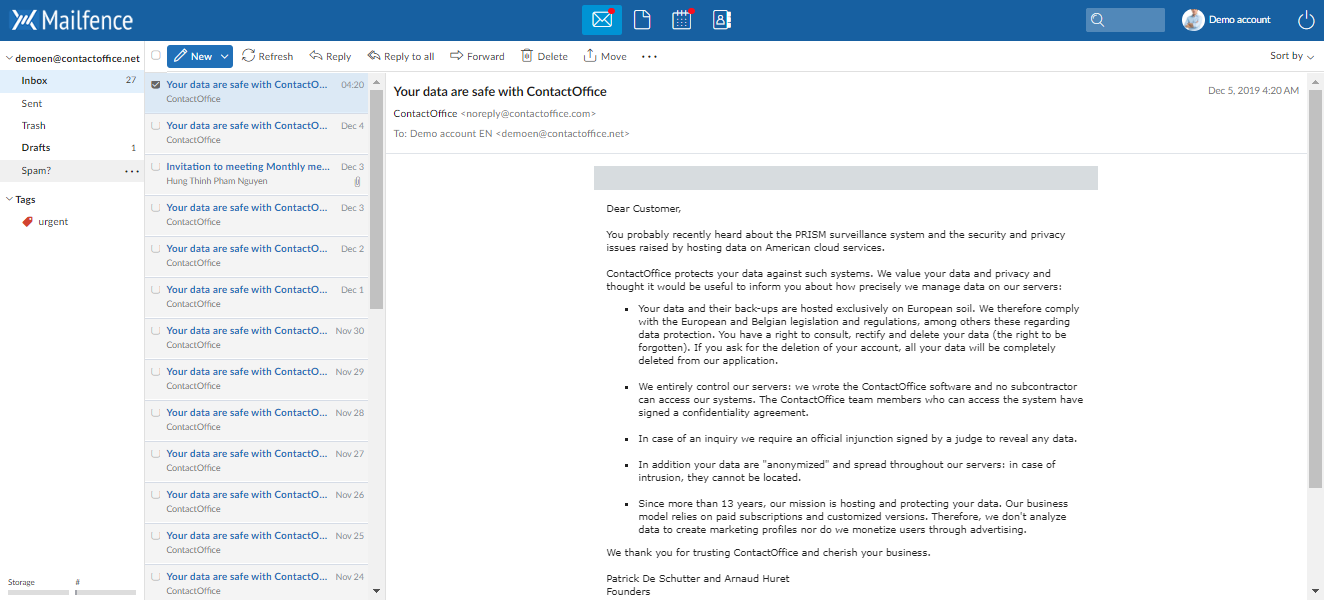
- Screenshot of Mailfence website, showing the user's inbox.
- Website type: Webmail
- Available in: List: English; French; Spanish; Portuguese; Italian; German; Dutch; Swedish; Russian; Turkish; Czech
- Headquarters: Brussels, Belgium
- Owner: ContactOffice Group
- Website: www.mailfence.com
- Commercial: Yes
- Registration: Required
- Launched: 12 November 2013; 12 years ago
- Current status: Online
- Content license: Proprietary

Mailfence is a Belgian encrypted email service with a focus on security and privacy that offers OpenPGP based end-to-end encryption and digital signatures for usage in emails. It was launched in November 2013 by ContactOffice Group, which has been operating an online collaboration suite since 1999.

== History ==
=== Development ===
The Mailfence project began development in 2013 by the founders of ContactOffice.

In March 2016, a beta version of end-to-end encryption and digital signatures for emails was released.

==== Mobile interface ====
In January 2021, Mailfence released a progressive web application for mobile devices.

=== Block in Russia ===
On 5 March 2020, Mailfence reported that their SMTP servers were being blocked by Russian-based email services. This had followed their refusal to respond to a request by the Roskomnadzor to collaborate with and provide information to the Russian government. Mailfence claimed that agreeing to the request would violate both its own privacy policy and Belgian law.

== See also ==
- Comparison of mail servers
- Comparison of webmail providers
