= RocketMail =

Defunct free webmail website

- RocketMail homepage (1998)
- Website type: Webmail
- Owner: Four11.com
- Website: rocketmail.com
- Commercial: Yes
- Registration: Yes
- Launched: 1996
- Current status: Defunct

RocketMail was one of the first major free webmail services. The service was originally a product of Four11 Corporation. For a brief time, RocketMail battled with Hotmail for the number-one spot among free webmail services. Four11, including RocketMail, was acquired by Yahoo! in 1997 for $92 million. Yahoo! assimilated the RocketMail engine. Yahoo! Mail was essentially the old RocketMail Webmail system.

At the time of the transition, RocketMail users could either choose a Yahoo! ID, since they were not guaranteed the availability of their RocketMail ID on Yahoo!, or could use username.rm as their Yahoo! ID. Thus, they were able to keep their rocketmail.com address and receive the same services as all Yahoo! users.

On 19 June 2008, Yahoo! started the RocketMail brand again by allowing new users to sign up for accounts under the rocketmail.com domain, which had not been possible since its acquisition of Four11 Corporation. In April 2013, Yahoo! closed support for creating new RocketMail email addresses; existing RocketMail accounts were not affected.
