= Email hosting service =

Internet hosting service

An email hosting service is a mailbox provider that offers premium email as opposed to advertisement-supported free email or free webmail. Email hosting services thus differ from typical end-user email providers such as webmail sites. They cater mostly to demanding email users and small and medium-sized (SME) businesses. Hosting providers can support user's own domain name, including any email authentication scheme that the domain owner wishes to enforce to convey the meaning that using a specific domain name identifies and qualifies email senders.

== See also ==
- Comparison of webmail providers
