= Yandex Mail =

Russian free email service

- Developer: Yandex
- Release: June 2000; 26 years ago
- Type: Email service
- Website: mail.yandex.com

Yandex Mail (Russian: Яндекс Почта, romanized: Yandeks Pochta; formerly stylised as Yandex.Mail) is a Russian free email service developed by Yandex. It was launched on 26 June 2000, and is one of the three largest email services in Runet (along with Gmail and Mail.ru). The service uses automatic spam filtering, checks for viruses using antivirus software from Dr.Web, and an email translator.

There is a mobile app, Yandex.Mail, for Android and iOS.

== History ==
Yandex.Mail began operations on 26 June 2000. In 2009, it was launched a free service, Yandex.Mail for domain, where users can create up to a thousand email accounts in one domain. In 2010, individual spam filters were added. An email translator was added in 2011; initially, only English and Ukrainian were available. Since 2016, 40 languages are available.

In 2012, Yandex.Mail was the fastest growing and one of the five most popular email services in Europe, and received 25 thousand unique visitors a month.

In 2013, email templates were added in Yandex.Mail. Since June 2013, the service has an "email marker" that differentiates incoming mails by their types.

In September 2020, Yandex.Mail 360 replaced Yandex.Mail for domain. It combines several Yandex services: Mail, Disk, Calendar, Messenger, Contacts and Notes, and provides users with 20 GB of free space.

=== Security incidents ===
In 2014, 1.2 million Yandex account credentials (logins and passwords) were published on a public leak forum. Yandex denied being attacked directly and instead suggested that users fell victim to phishing.

In February 2021, Yandex disclosed that an employee had been selling access to user accounts. Yandex stated that it notified owners of 4887 affected accounts urging them to change passwords.
