= GMX Mail =

Free, ad-supported email service by GMX

Coordinates: 48.1881°N 11.5868°E

- Company type: Subsidiary of United Internet
- Website type: Webmail, POP3, IMAP4
- Available in: 4 languages
- Headquarters: Brauerstraße 48, Karlsruhe
- Owners: GMX Internet Services, Inc.
- Website: gmx.net: German gmx.com: US English gmx.co.uk: UK English gmx.es: Spanish gmx.fr: French
- Commercial: Yes
- Registration: Required
- Users: 11 million active users
- Launched: 1997
- Current status: Online
- Content license: Proprietary

GMX Mail is a free, advertising-supported email service provided by Global Mail eXchange or Global Message eXchange in Germany. Users may access received GMX mail via webmail, or using POP3 or IMAP4 protocols. Mail is sent using SMTP. Founded in 1997, GMX is a subsidiary of Ionos SE, a stock-listed company in Germany, and a sister company to Ionos and Fasthosts Internet. In addition to an email address, each GMX account includes a Mail Collector, Address Book, Organizer, and File Storage. Every user can register up to 10 individual GMX email addresses. Popup ads are displayed to all users, including premium, at GMX login; as of 2021 GMX was the only large email provider using popup ads.

== Security ==
GMX Mail provides GMX.net and GMX.com users two-factor authentication (2FA) as a security measure.

== Accessibilty ==
Currently GMX Mail only allows users from select few countries to have an account. This includes

- United Kingdom
- Germany
- Switzerland
- Austria
- Italy
- Australia
- United States
- Canada
- Mexico
- Brazil
- Belgium
- Denmark
- Finland
- France
- Hungary
- Ireland
- Netherlands
- Norway
- Poland
- Romania
- Spain
- Turkey
- South Africa
- Israel
- Hong Kong
- Singapore
- Japan
- New Zealand
- Portugal
