= Outlook.com =

Microsoft webmail service

- Screenshot showing Outlook.com inbox (with an open Skype window) on Outlook.com's own webmail interface
- Website type: Webmail, calendaring, contacts, and tasks
- Available in: 106 languages
- Owner: Microsoft
- Founders: Sabeer Bhatia and Jack Smith
- Website: outlook.live.com
- IPv6 support: Yes
- Commercial: Yes
- Registration: Required
- Users: 500 million
- Launched: July 4, 1996; 30 years ago (as Hotmail); July 31, 2012; 14 years ago (as Outlook.com)
- Content license: Proprietary

Outlook.com, formerly Hotmail, is a free personal email service offered by Microsoft. It also provides a webmail interface accessible via web browser or mobile apps featuring mail, calendaring, contacts, and tasks services. Outlook can also be accessed via email clients using the IMAP or POP protocols.

Founded in 1995 by Sabeer Bhatia and Jack Smith as Hotmail, it was acquired by Microsoft in 1997 for an estimated $400 million, with it becoming part of the MSN family of online services, branded as MSN Hotmail. In May 2007, the service was rebranded to Windows Live Hotmail, as part of the Windows Live suite of products. It was changed back to Hotmail in October 2011 and was fully replaced by Outlook in May 2013, sharing the same brand as the Microsoft Outlook software which is offered via a Microsoft 365 (formerly Microsoft Office) subscription.

Outlook is offered with any Microsoft account, using the @outlook.com and @hotmail.com domains. Various other domains, including @live.com, @msn.com, @passport.com and @windowslive.com, are maintained but are no longer offered.

== History ==
=== Launch of Hotmail ===
Hotmail logo used from 1996 to 1998

Hotmail service was founded by Sabeer Bhatia and Jack Smith, and was one of the first webmail services on the Internet along with Four11's RocketMail (later Yahoo! Mail). It was commercially launched on July 4, 1996, symbolizing "freedom" from ISP-based email and the ability to access a user's inbox from anywhere in the world. The name "Hotmail" was chosen out of many possibilities ending in "-mail" as it included the letters HTML, the markup language used to create web pages, and to emphasize this, the original type casing was "HoTMaiL". The limit for free storage was 2 MB. Hotmail was initially backed by about $310,000 of financing from venture capital firm Draper Assoicates. By December 1997, it reported more than 8.5 million subscribers. Hotmail initially ran under Solaris for mail services and Apache on FreeBSD for web services, before being partly converted to Microsoft products, using Windows Services for UNIX in the migration path. At the time of commercial launch, Hotmail had 9 staff members.

=== MSN Hotmail ===
A 2001 Hotmail inbox layout embedded in Microsoft Outlook

The old MSN Hotmail inbox from 2007

Hotmail was sold to Microsoft in December 1997 for a reported $400 million (~$744 million in 2025), and it joined the MSN group of services. The sale had been preceded by a major incident in 1997 where all email was lost for 25% of mailboxes. Hotmail quickly gained in popularity as it was localized for different markets around the globe, and became the world's largest webmail service with more than 30 million active members reported by February 1999.

Hotmail originally ran on a mixture of FreeBSD and Solaris operating systems. A project was started to move Hotmail to Windows 2000. In June 2001, Microsoft claimed this had been completed; a few days later they retracted the statement and admitted that the DNS functions of the Hotmail system were still reliant on FreeBSD. In 2002 Hotmail still ran its infrastructure on UNIX servers, with only the front-end converted to Windows 2000. Later development saw the service tied with Microsoft's web authentication scheme, Microsoft Passport (now Microsoft account), and integration with Microsoft's instant messaging and social networking programs, MSN Messenger and MSN Spaces (later Windows Live Messenger and Windows Live Spaces, respectively).

==== Security issues ====
In 1999, hackers revealed a security flaw in Hotmail that permitted anybody to log in to any Hotmail account using the password 'eh'. At the time, it was called "the most widespread security incident in the history of the Web". In 2001, the Hotmail service was compromised again by computer hackers who discovered that anyone could log in to their Hotmail account and then pull messages from any other Hotmail account by crafting a URL with the second account's username and a valid message number. It was such a simple attack that by the time the patch was made, dozens of newspapers and hundreds of web sites published exact descriptions allowing tens of thousands of hackers to run rampant across Hotmail. The exploitable vulnerability exposed millions of accounts to tampering between August 7 and 31, 2001.

==== Competition ====
In 2004, Google announced its own mail service, Gmail. Featuring greater storage space, speed, and interface flexibility, it spurred a wave of innovation in webmail. The main industry heavyweights – Hotmail and Yahoo! Mail – introduced upgraded versions of their email services with greater speed, security, and advanced features.

=== Windows Live Hotmail ===
Microsoft's new email system was announced on November 1, 2005, under the codename "Kahuna", and a beta version was released to a few thousand testers. Other webmail enthusiasts also wanting to try the beta version could request an invitation granting access. The new service was built from scratch and emphasized three main concepts of being "faster, simpler, and safer". New versions of the beta service were rolled out over the development period, and by the end of 2006 the number of beta testers had reached the millions.

The Hotmail brand was planned to be phased out when Microsoft announced that the new mail system would be called Windows Live Mail, but the developers soon backtracked after beta testers were confused with the name change and preferred the already well-known Hotmail name, and decided on Windows Live Hotmail. After a period of beta testing, it was officially released to new and existing users in the Netherlands on November 9, 2006, as a pilot market. Development of the beta was finished in April 2007, and Windows Live Hotmail was released to new registrations on May 7, 2007, as the 260 million MSN Hotmail accounts worldwide gained access to the new system. The old MSN Hotmail interface was accessible only by users who registered before the Windows Live Hotmail release date and had not chosen to update to the new service. The rollout to all existing users was completed in October 2007.

Windows Live Hotmail was awarded PC Magazine's Editor's Choice Award in February 2007, March 2007, and February 2011.

In 2008 it was announced that the service would be updated with focus on improving the speed, increasing the storage space, better user experience and usability features, and that sign-in and email access speeds would be up to 70 percent faster. The classic and full versions of Windows Live Hotmail were combined in the new release. As a result of user feedback, Hotmail was updated so that scrolling works for users who have the reading pane turned off. It was also expected that Hotmail team would be moving the advertisement from the top of page to the side, adding more themes, increasing the number of messages on each page and adding the ability to send instant messages from the user's inbox in future releases.

Support for Firefox in the upgraded Windows Live Hotmail took a few months to complete. By 2009, support for Google Chrome was still incomplete, prompting the Chrome developers to temporarily ship a browser that employed user agent spoofing when making requests to the Windows Live site.

As part of the update, Microsoft also added integrated capability for instant messaging with contacts on the Windows Live Messenger service. The feature was the realization of a project that began as "Windows Live Web Messenger" in 2007, a replacement for the outdated "MSN Web Messenger" service that was first introduced in August 2004. It was noted that the original "Windows Live Web Messenger" featured tabbed conversations in a "conversation workspace", however since its integration with Hotmail this has been removed.

Microsoft's search engine Bing was integrated into Hotmail in 2009 through the introduction of a "Quick Add" feature, allowing users to add search results from Bing into emails. These include images, maps and business listings.

On May 18, 2010, Microsoft unveiled the "Wave 4" update of Hotmail, which offered features such as 1-click filters, active views, inbox sweeping, and 10 GB space for photos, Microsoft Office documents, and attachments. It also included integration with Windows Live SkyDrive and Windows Live Office, a free version of Microsoft's Office Web Apps suite. The new version began its gradual release to all Hotmail users on June 15, 2010 and was completely rolled out on August 3, 2010. Exchange ActiveSync support was enabled to all Hotmail users on August 30, 2010, allowing users to sync their mail, contacts, calendar and tasks to their mobile devices that supports the protocol. Addition of full-session SSL was released on November 9, 2010.

Throughout 2011, Microsoft added several new features to Hotmail, such as aliases and speed improvements. In October 2011, Microsoft unveiled a "re-invented Hotmail", and added many new features such as Instant Actions, scheduled Sweep, and Categories and this update began fully rolling out on November 9, 2011. This update also made SSL enabled by default on all accounts.

=== Transition to Outlook.com ===
Outlook.com, with third-party add-ins within a new message preview

Outlook.com was first introduced on July 31, 2012, when its beta version was made available to the general public. Existing Hotmail customers could freely upgrade to the preview version of Outlook.com and downgrade back.

Outlook.com graduated preview stage on February 18, 2013. The upgrade was deployed the same day, users kept their existing Hotmail accounts and received the option of having an @outlook.com email address. By May 2013, the upgrade was completed and Outlook.com had 400 million active users. By May 2014, Outlook.com continued to have 400 million active users.

==== Transition to new infrastructure ====
In May 2015, Microsoft announced it would move the service over to what it described as an Office 365-based infrastructure. This was followed in June 2015 by the introduction through an opt-in preview of new features, including new calendar layout options, a filtering service called "Clutter" and new theme designs. Microsoft also introduced the ability for third-party providers such as PayPal and Evernote to include add-ins into the service. Additionally, contact suggestions and updates from emails such as flight reservations are due to be introduced to Office 365 subscribers' accounts and Outlook.com users' from January and March 2016 respectively. With the upgrade, users were no longer able to use the Windows Live Mail 2012 client to synchronize their email, contacts and calendar event using the official settings; they were encouraged to view Outlook.com through a web browser, through the Mail app, or through the Microsoft Outlook client. However, Windows Live Mail could be configured to use the IMAP protocol (or the less effective POP3) to fetch mail only. Microsoft concluded this preview stage in February 2016, when it began to roll out the new version to users' accounts, beginning with North America.

==== 2017 redesign ====
Outlook.com 2017 beta

On August 8, 2017, Microsoft launched a new opt-in beta toggle allowing users to test upcoming changes to the Outlook.com Mail, including a faster inbox, a responsive design, and the ability to search for emojis. There was also an introduction of the Photos Hub, the fifth component of Outlook.com.

On October 30, 2017, Microsoft announced that it would phase out its "Outlook.com Premium" subscription service, which offered features such as expanded storage and removal of ads from the user interface. These benefits were subsequently made available to Office 365 subscribers, and Microsoft will no longer accept new subscriptions to Outlook.com Premium. Existing Outlook.com Premium subscribers may continue to renew their existing subscription.

The old interface, which dated from 2016, was phased out in 2019.

== Features ==
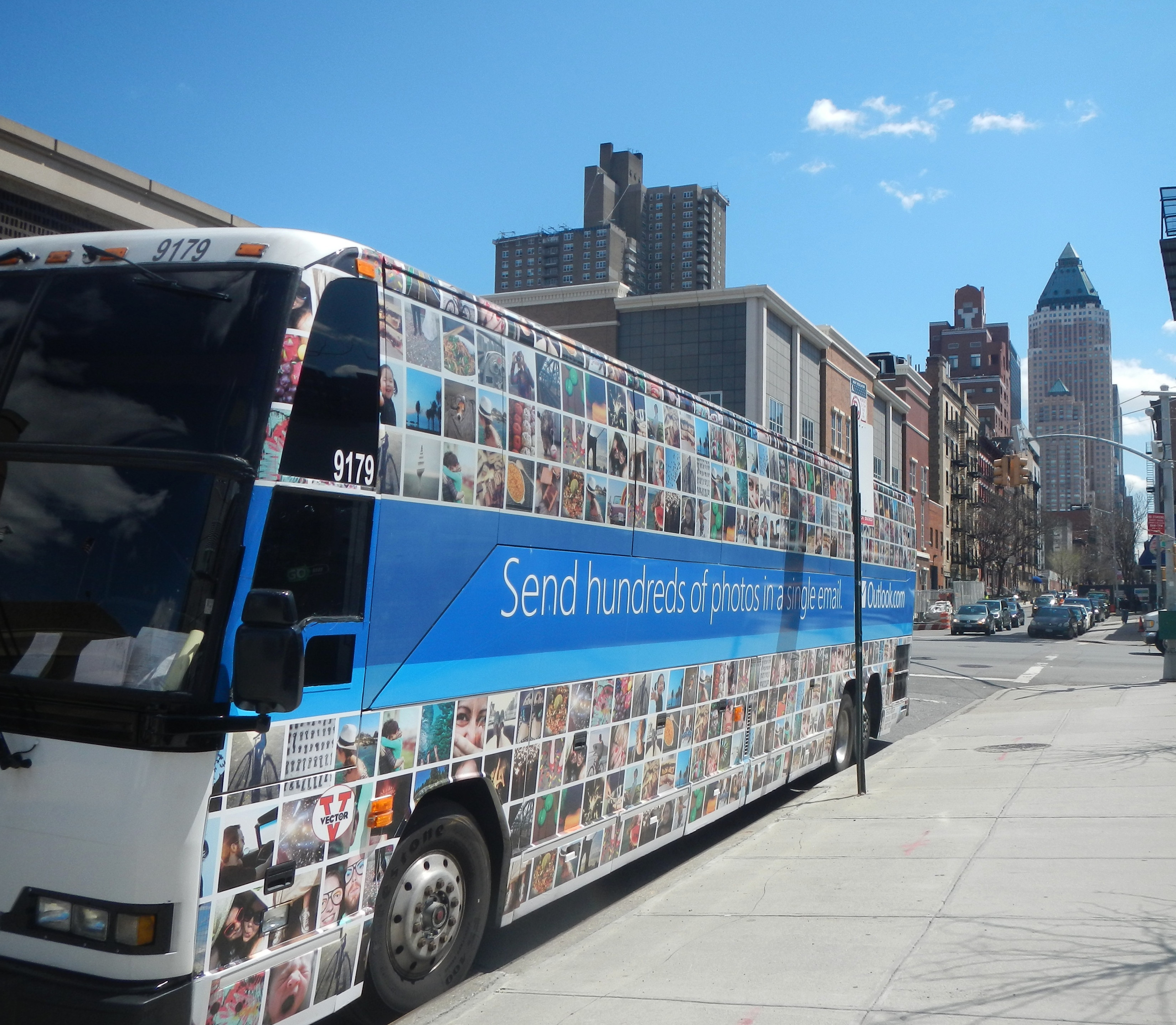
Advertisement for Outlook.com on the side of a bus, 2013

Similar to other major webmail services, Outlook.com uses Ajax programming techniques and supports later versions of Internet Explorer, Firefox, Safari, and Google Chrome. Some of its features include keyboard controls giving the ability to navigate around the page without using the mouse, the ability to search the user's messages including structured query syntax such as "from:ebay", message filters, folder-based organization of messages, auto-completion of contact addresses when composing, contact grouping, importing and exporting of contacts as CSV files, rich text formatting, rich text signatures, spam filtering and virus scanning, support for multiple addresses, and different language versions.

One example of a feature no longer present is the ability to create custom domain names.

=== Security and privacy ===
Outlook.com has promised to respect users' privacy, specifically targeting Gmail's privacy practices. Outlook.com does not scan emails or attachments for advertising information and personal conversations are entirely ad-free.

In March 2014, when former Microsoft employee Alex Kibkalo was arrested for his involvement in the 2012 leaking of Microsoft's trade secrets, Microsoft came under criticism for having accessed the email inbox of his French accomplice. Critics claim these actions violate privacy laws as well as Microsoft's own promises with regards to users' personal information, while others have pointed out that such access is permitted under Microsoft's privacy policies in order to "protect the rights or property of Microsoft", that it was necessary in order to prevent a crime intended to have inflicted billions of dollars of damage, and that such action on Microsoft's part is unprecedented in 18 years. In response to the criticism, Microsoft has announced that it would no longer access private account information themselves in such cases, but would instead hand the investigation over to law enforcement agencies.

Outlook.com uses DMARC specifications to provide better security for message transmission and Extended Validation Certificate to secure the user's connection with Outlook.com. On April 17, 2013, Microsoft added two step verification to Microsoft accounts, thereby by extension to Outlook.com.

Outlook also allows for a single-use code to be used instead of a user's password when signing into a Microsoft account. Each code can only be used once, but one can be requested whenever needed. If a user is signing in on a public computer—such as at the library or school—using a single-use code helps keep account information secure. The single-use code is sent to the user when requested during login.

=== Office for the web integration ===
The shortcut panel, which links various Microsoft online services, including Outlook.com

Outlook.com integrates with Office for the web to allow viewing and editing of Microsoft Word, Excel and PowerPoint documents that are attached to the email messages. Users can directly open attached Office documents in the web browser, and save them into their OneDrive. Users can also perform edits to any received Office documents, and directly reply to the sender with the edited version of the document. In addition, users may also send up to 2 GB of Office documents (up to 25 MB each) using Outlook.com by uploading these documents onto OneDrive, and share these documents with other users for viewing or collaboration. Users can also save emails to OneNote.

=== Skype integration ===
A preview version of Skype for Outlook.com started rolling out in the UK on April 30, 2013. This feature allows users to make a Skype video call within Outlook.com without using the Skype desktop client.

=== Aliases ===
Users can create additional, unique email addresses, called aliases, for their Microsoft account. As of April 17, 2013, users can sign in with any alias and create up to 10 aliases per year for a total of up to 10 addresses. For a given account, all aliases use the same inbox, contact list, and account settings—including password—as the primary address. Once an alias is set up, users can choose to have all email sent to that address go to the inbox, or to a different folder. Emails sent from an alias do not reveal to recipients that they come from an account with other addresses.

=== Keyboard shortcuts ===
The freeware version of hotmail.com provides a list of almost 50 keyboard shortcuts for web users with vision impairment, blindness or other disabilities.

== Components ==
=== Mail ===
Mail is the webmail component of Outlook.com. The default view is a three column view with folders and groups on the left, a list of email messages in the middle, and the selected message on the right.

Mail's Active View allows users to interact directly with contents and functionality within their email message. For example, any photo attachments can be previewed directly using Active View. In addition, Mail provides a partner platform which allows contents and functionality from various websites and services such as YouTube, Flickr, LinkedIn, and the United States Postal Service to be viewed directly within the email message. For example, users may view the YouTube video within Mail when a user receives an email which contains a link to the video. Other Active View features include tracking of real time shipping status from United States Postal Service and performing social networking actions on LinkedIn or other social networking sites directly from within the email message.

Mail offers a "virtual broom" which allow users to delete or move large numbers of emails into specified folders based on the sender's information. Once a "sweep" is performed, the user may choose to configure Mail to remember the sweep settings and perform the same move or delete actions for any future emails. Users may also set up custom message rules based on the sender's or recipient's information, the subject of the email, or attachments to the email. There is also an option to delete/move messages that are older than a specified number of days, or only keep the latest message from a sender.

Quick views allow users to filter all emails (in all folders) by document attachments, photo attachments, flagged messages, or shipping updates. One-click filters allow users to filter the inbox (or specific folder) based on whether or not the email message is unread, from the People service list, group mailing lists, or from a social networking website (à la LinkedIn). Categories appear under quick views for ease of access.

=== Calendar ===
Calendar, as seen in 2016

Outlook's time-management web application was first released on January 14, 2008, as Windows Live Calendar, and was updated to the "Wave 4" release on June 7, 2010. It was updated with Microsoft's Metro design in a phased roll-out to users from April 2, 2013.

Calendar features a similar interface to desktop calendar applications such as Windows Calendar, and supports iCalendar files for users to import calendar entries into their calendars. It uses Ajax technology which enables users to view, add and drag-and-drop calendar events from one date to another without reloading the page, and features daily, weekly, monthly and agenda view modes. It also features a to-do list function for users to keep track of their tasks to be completed.

Calendar events are stored online and can be viewed from any location. Multiple calendars can be created and shared, allowing different levels of permissions for each user.

=== People ===
Outlook's contacts management service was originally known as Windows Live Contacts and before that, Windows Live People. It provides users with access to their contacts' profiles and information, allowing them to share different information with different groups of people. Besides an address book, People also provides integrated services with social media, such as Facebook and Twitter. The service was rebranded to its current name in 2012, introducing a new interface based on the Metro design language that had already been introduced with Outlook.com.

Contacts are automatically updated in real-time, and the service allows for the removal of duplicated contact entries when imported with Profile. Users can also set limits on what parts of their contact details can be seen by others.

=== To Do ===
To Do is task management component of Outlook.com introduced during the transition to the Office 365-based infrastructure.

== Mail client access ==
Outlook.com supports email clients connecting through the following protocols, listed in chronological order:

- WebDAV was used by Outlook Express but was discontinued on September 1, 2009.
- Microsoft Outlook 2002, introduced in Microsoft Office XP, included integrated support for Outlook.com accounts.
- DeltaSync was used by Microsoft Outlook Hotmail Connector, a free plug-in for Microsoft Outlook 2003, 2007 or 2010. Using the Outlook connector, users can freely access email messages, contacts, and calendars in any Outlook.com account, though access to tasks and notes requires a premium subscription. Another alternative for users is to use the Windows Live Mail desktop client, which had built-in support for Hotmail.
- Post Office Protocol version 3 (POP3) access was made available for all Hotmail accounts as part of the "Wave 3" release, adding support to access Hotmail from any email client that supported this protocol.
- Exchange ActiveSync (EAS) support was added as part of the Hotmail "Wave 4" release, allowing users to synchronise not just their email, but also their contacts and calendar on any device that supports EAS.
- On September 12, 2013, Microsoft added support for Internet Message Access Protocol (IMAP) and OAuth.
- In November 2019, Microsoft added a feature for users to have their emails read aloud in the Outlook app, named "Play My Emails".

== Competitors ==
Outlook competes with numerous other free public email services such as Gmail, Yahoo! Mail, Proton Mail, Tutanota or GMX Mail.

== Controversy ==
=== Popularity with spammers ===
Like many free webmail services, Hotmail was often used by spammers for illicit purposes such as junk or chain mailing and unwanted marketing, due to wide availability, service popularity, and ease of registration of new accounts. However, Outlook does not tolerate the practice, and its service agreement states that any account engaging in those activities will be terminated without further warning.

=== Requests for contact details ===
The ability to associate Outlook.com accounts with mobile phones or other email addresses was initially advertised as an optional feature. However, an update in 2013 required many users to associate their accounts before the website would allow them to log in – a refusal which could be sidestepped by using an app, such as Windows Live Mail 2011 or 2012, to access the account instead of a web browser (and it remains possible to "associate" an account with a one-use, or otherwise 'disposable', e-mail address). Some users also saw messages that their accounts would expire if they continued to use them anonymously.

=== US government surveillance ===
According to TheGuardian.com, several top-secret internal National Security Agency (NSA) newsletters indicate that Microsoft has allowed NSA to access chats and emails on Outlook.com, and implemented a bypass of its advertised encryption in order to facilitate government access.

- One newsletter entry dated December 26, 2012, shows that Microsoft had "developed a surveillance capability to deal" with the interception of encrypted chats on Outlook.com, within five months after the service went into public testing.
- Another entry states that "for Prism collection against Hotmail, Live, and Outlook.com emails will be unaffected because Prism collects this data prior to encryption".

In response to the report, Microsoft stated, among other things, that "when we upgrade or update products we aren't absolved from the need to comply with existing or future lawful demands" and that "there are aspects of this debate that we wish we were able to discuss more freely".

=== Outlook Outage ===
On November 2026, Outlook and Microsoft 365 were temporarily offline due to an outage that lasted several days. This outage impacted businesses, government, schools and healthcare providers who rely on these services. In a statement, Charles Lamanna, Vice President of Copilots, Agents and Platform at Microsoft stated the cause was "a latent defect (causing) servers to become overwhelmed and unresponsive under certain load conditions".

On November 13, 2026, guests at Phantasialand's Hotel Ling Bao in Brühl, Germany suffered injuries after an automatic chlorine dosing system malfunctioned. This malfunction caused excess chlorine levels to be pumped into pool water, affecting guests. 15 people were checked by paramedics, with 5 suffering injuries as a result. The hotel's monitoring system runs on Outlook, and as a result of the outage it was unable to send an email notifying hotel staff of the excess chlorine levels.

== See also ==
- Comparison of webmail providers
