= Yahoo Mail =

American email service

Yahoo! Mail

- Screenshot of the web-based Yahoo Mail client (2017 version)
- Website type: Webmail
- Available in: Multilingual (27)
- Website: mail.yahoo.com
- Commercial: Yes
- Registration: Required
- Users: 225 million active monthly users (February 2017)
- Launched: October 8, 1997; 29 years ago
- Current status: Online
- Content license: Proprietary

Yahoo! Mail (also written as Yahoo Mail) is a mailbox provider by Yahoo. It is one of the largest email services worldwide, with 225 million users. It is accessible via a web browser (webmail), mobile app, or through third-party email clients via the POP, SMTP, and IMAP protocols. Users can also connect non-Yahoo e-mail accounts to their Yahoo Mail inbox. The service was launched on October 8, 1997.

The service is free for personal use, with an optional monthly fee for additional features.

It is also available in several languages other than English.

== History ==
=== 1997–2002 ===
Yahoo! webmail interface as it appeared in 2001

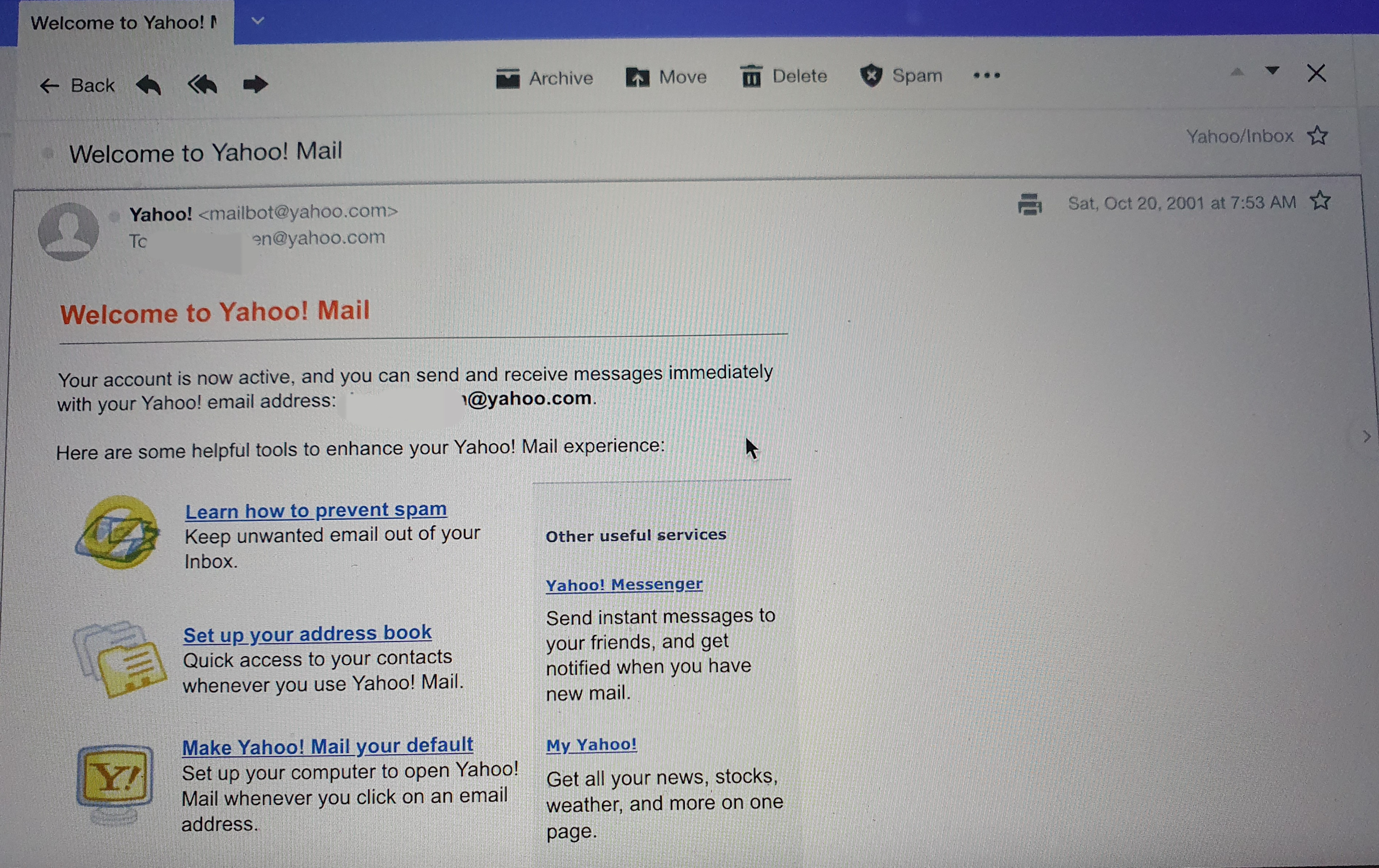
First mail of Yahoo after creation in 2001

On October 8, 1997, Yahoo announced its acquisition of online communications company Four11 for $92 million in stock. As part of the purchase, Yahoo received Four11's RocketMail webmail service. Yahoo Mail, based on the RocketMail technology, launched at the same time. Yahoo! chose acquisition rather than internal platform development, because, as Healy said, "Hotmail was growing at thousands and thousands users per week. We did an analysis. For us to build, it would have taken four to six months, and by then, so many users would have taken an email account. The speed of the market was critical."

On March 21, 2002, Yahoo! eliminated free software client access and introduced the $29.99 per year Mail Forwarding Service. Mary Osako, a Yahoo! Spokeswoman, told CNET, "For-pay services on Yahoo!, originally launched in February 1999, have experienced great acceptance from our base of active registered users, and we expect this adoption to continue to grow."

=== 2002–2010 ===
During 2002, the Yahoo network was gradually redesigned, including the company website, Yahoo Mail and other services. Along with the new design, new features were implemented, including drop-down menus in DHTML and keyboard shortcuts.

Yahoo! Messenger chat integration in the Yahoo! Mail webmail interface, in beta in 2007

On July 9, 2004, Yahoo! acquired Oddpost, a webmail service which simulated a desktop email client. Oddpost had features such as drag-and-drop support, right-click menus, RSS feeds, a preview pane, and increased speed using email caching to shorten response time. Many of the features were incorporated into an updated Yahoo! Mail service.

==== Competition ====
On April 1, 2004, Google announced its Gmail service with 1 GB of storage, although Gmail's invitation-only accounts kept the other webmail services at the forefront. Most major webmail providers, including Yahoo! Mail, increased their mailbox storage in response. Yahoo! first announced 100 MB of storage for basic accounts and 2 GB of storage for premium users. However, soon Yahoo Mail increased its free storage quota to 1 GB, before eventually allowing unlimited storage from March 27, 2007, until October 8, 2013.

=== 2011–2021 ===
Yahoo! Mail logo from 2009

Screenshot of the 2011 version of Yahoo! Mail

In May 2011, Yahoo Mail rolled out a new interface. It included updated design, enhanced performance, and improved Facebook integration.

In 2013, Yahoo! redesigned the site and removed several features, such as simultaneously opening multiple emails in tabs, sorting by sender name, and dragging mails to folders. The new email interface was geared to give an improved user-experience for mobile devices, but was criticized for having an inferior desktop interface. Many users objected to the unannounced nature of the changes through an online post asking Yahoo! to bring back mail tabs with one hundred thousand voting and nearly ten thousand commenting. The redesign produced a problem that caused an unknown number of users to lose access to their accounts for several weeks.

In December 2013, Yahoo! Mail suffered a major outage where approximately one million users, one percent of the site's total users, could not access their emails for several days. Yahoo!'s then-CEO Marissa Mayer publicly apologized to the site's users.

China Yahoo Mail announced in April 2013 that it would shut down that August as part of Yahoo ceasing services in China since acquiring a stake in Alibaba in 2005. Users with email address suffixes @yahoo.com.cn and @yahoo.cn could transfer their accounts to AliCloud to continue receiving messages through the end of 2014.

In January 2014, an undisclosed number of usernames and passwords were released to hackers, following a security breach that Yahoo! believed had occurred through a third-party website. Yahoo! contacted affected users and requested that passwords be changed.

In October 2015, Yahoo! updated the mail service with a "more subtle" redesign, as well as improved mobile features. The same release introduced the Yahoo! Account Key, a smartphone-based replacement for password logins. The app also added support for third-party mail accounts.

In 2017, Yahoo! again redesigned the web interface with a "more minimal" look, and introduced the option to customize it with different color themes and layouts.

In 2019, Yahoo released a redesigned Yahoo Mail app to organize user inboxes, introducing features including a one-tap unsubscribe tool, package tracking, and travel updates.

In 2020, Yahoo Mail users were able to fill Walmart shopping carts directly from their inboxes, an industry first. Yahoo! also added a feature to view NFL matches.

=== 2022–present ===
In 2022, updates to the Yahoo Mail mobile app added tools to help manage receipts, gift cards, and subscriptions. AI-based additions in 2023 included a feature that automates tracking coupon codes and credits for online shopping, as well as updates to search suggestions, message summaries and AI writing assistance. In 2024, updates to the desktop interface added more AI-based features, including a "priority inbox" tab with automatically generated summaries of important messages and automated suggestions of next actions based on message contents.

In February 2025, Yahoo aired its first Super Bowl ad since 2002, in which Bill Murray invited viewers to contact him at his Yahoo Mail email address (billhimself@yahoo.com). The address received nearly 150,000 emails in the first two hours after broadcast. In June 2025, Yahoo Mail introduced a "Catch Up" feature that provides AI-generated summaries and email previews and prompts users to choose to delete or retain each one. As part of the feature's launch, Yahoo Mail collaborated with streetwear brand Anti Social Social Club on an apparel release.

== User interface ==
As many as three web interfaces were available at any given time. The traditional "Yahoo! Mail Classic" preserved the availability of their original 1997 interface until July 2013 in North America. A 2005 version included a new Ajax interface, drag-and-drop, improved search, keyboard shortcuts, address auto-completion, and tabs. However, other features were removed, such as column widths and one click delete-move-to-next. In October 2010, Yahoo! released a beta version of Yahoo! Mail, which included improvements to performance, search, and Facebook integration. In May 2011, this became the default interface. The current Webmail interface was introduced in 2024.

== Spam policy ==
Yahoo! Mail is often used by spammers to provide a "remove me" email address. Often, these addresses are used to verify the recipient's address, thus opening the door for more spam.

Yahoo! does not tolerate this practice and terminates accounts connected with spam-related activities without warning, causing spammers to lose access to any other Yahoo! services connected with their ID under the Terms of Service. Additionally, Yahoo! stresses that its servers are based in California and any spam-related activity which uses its servers could potentially violate that state's anti-spam laws.

In February 2006, Yahoo! announced its decision (along with AOL) to give some organizations the option to "certify" mail by paying up to one cent for each outgoing message, allowing the mail in question to bypass inbound spam filters. Few mailers used it and, Goodmail, the company running the certification process, shut down in 2011.

=== Filters ===
In order to prevent abuse, in 2001 Yahoo! Mail activated filters which changed certain words and word fragments, which could trigger unwanted JavaScript events, into other words. For example, eval" (short for "evaluation") became "review". This resulted in unintended corrections, such as "medireview" (medieval).

When asked about these changes, Yahoo! explained that the changed words were common terms used in their privacy dashboard and were blacklisted to prevent hackers from sending damaging commands via the program's HTML function. Yahoo adjusted its filters to address the issue in July 2002.

== Controversies ==
=== Shi Tao arrest ===
In 2004, Yahoo's Hong Kong office provided technical information to the Chinese authorities about the account of journalist Shi Tao, who was subsequently sentenced to ten years' imprisonment for "leaking state secrets". Yahoo! was criticized by Reporters Without Borders for acting as a "police informant" to increase its profits. In August 2007, the United States Congress began an investigation into Yahoo's handling of the case. Yahoo! founder Jerry Yang testified before Congress. On November 6, 2007, the congressional panel criticized Yahoo! for not giving full details to the House Foreign Affairs Committee the previous year, stating it had been "at best inexcusably negligent" and at worst "deceptive". Representative Tom Lantos described its executives as moral "pygmies". Yang stated that Yahoo! no longer controlled its Chinese operations, and was collaborating with human rights groups to formulate ethical code for technology companies.

In a February 2006 hearing, Yahoo! executives swore that they had received no information about the investigation. Several months later, it was discovered that the document provided to Yahoo! China on April 22, 2004, by the Beijing State Security Bureau stated that "Your office is in possession of the following items relating to a case of suspected illegal provision of state secrets to foreign entities."

On November 13, 2007, Yahoo! settled with Shi for an undisclosed sum. Shi was released from prison in September 2013.

=== Username bans ===
On February 20, 2006, it was revealed that Yahoo! Mail was banning the word "Allah" in email usernames, both separately and as part of a user name such as linda.callahan. Shortly after the news of the ban, it was lifted on February 23, 2006.

=== Exploit ===
In November 2012, an exploit for Yahoo! Mail was sold for $700 by an Egyptian hacker, allowing hijackers to hack Yahoo! Mail user accounts and redirect users to a malicious website. The attack used cross-site scripting which let hackers steal cookies. In January 2013, hacker and security researcher Shahin Ramezany pointed out another DOM-based XSS loophole that placed 400 million users at risk.

=== Deletion of accounts ===
In 2013, Yahoo! deleted accounts that hadn't been logged into for more than 12 months and gave those names to other users. This included accounts that had set up email forwarding to other accounts, who didn't notice and act upon the message to preserve their account. Spillover from this action resulted in some users losing access to accounts on other services as their email resets were no longer forwarded to them, but to the new owner of their former account.

=== Phishing attack ===
From 2007, Yahoo! was the email service used by New Zealand Telecom, which came under criticism in early 2013 following a spam and phishing attack that was described as the biggest to have ever hit the country. Telecom and Yahoo! automatically reset "about 60,000" users' passwords. In April, Telecom announced that despite the issue, it would retain Yahoo! as an email provider.

=== Account theft ===
On October 3, 2017, Yahoo! reported that all Yahoo! user accounts, approximately 3 billion, were affected by the previously announced August 2013 theft of accounts. This information updates the December 14, 2016, announcement that more than 1 billion user accounts were hacked in a breach that had occurred in 2013. Earlier that year in September, Yahoo! announced that an additional 500 million user accounts had been breached in 2014. The company was said to have discovered about the breach that affected hundreds of millions of accounts years before their initial announcement.

=== Automated scanning of email content ===
The contents of Yahoo! Mail messages are scanned for the purposes of targeted advertising, in contrast to its main competitors Gmail (which ended the practice in late 2017) and Outlook.com (which did not employ the practice).

=== Content sharing with the National Security Agency ===
In 2015, Reuters reported that Yahoo! has implemented a functionality to scan all incoming emails for specific keywords and share email content in real time with the US National Security Agency.

== Email addresses ==
New Yahoo! Mail accounts, and most of the service's accounts, use yahoo.com and myyahoo.com as the email suffix. Previously, users could choose ymail.com or rocketmail.com as a suffix, or one of several country-specific suffixes. Many countries were available, such as yahoo.co.uk in the United Kingdom, yahoo.fr in France (also used by francophones) and yahoo.it in Italy. While these suffixes are discontinued for new accounts, they are preserved for existing accounts. Yahoo! Japan Mail, a separate service, offers both yahoo.co.jp and ymail.ne.jp as suffixes. Internet service providers using Yahoo! Mail offer their own suffixes for subscribers, with AT&T also offering free accounts to non-subscribers.

Business email was previously available with the Yahoo! Small Business brand. It transitioned to Verizon Small Business Essentials in early 2022.

== See also ==
- Comparison of webmail providers
- List of Yahoo!-owned sites and services
