= Webmail =

Email service that can be accessed using a web browser

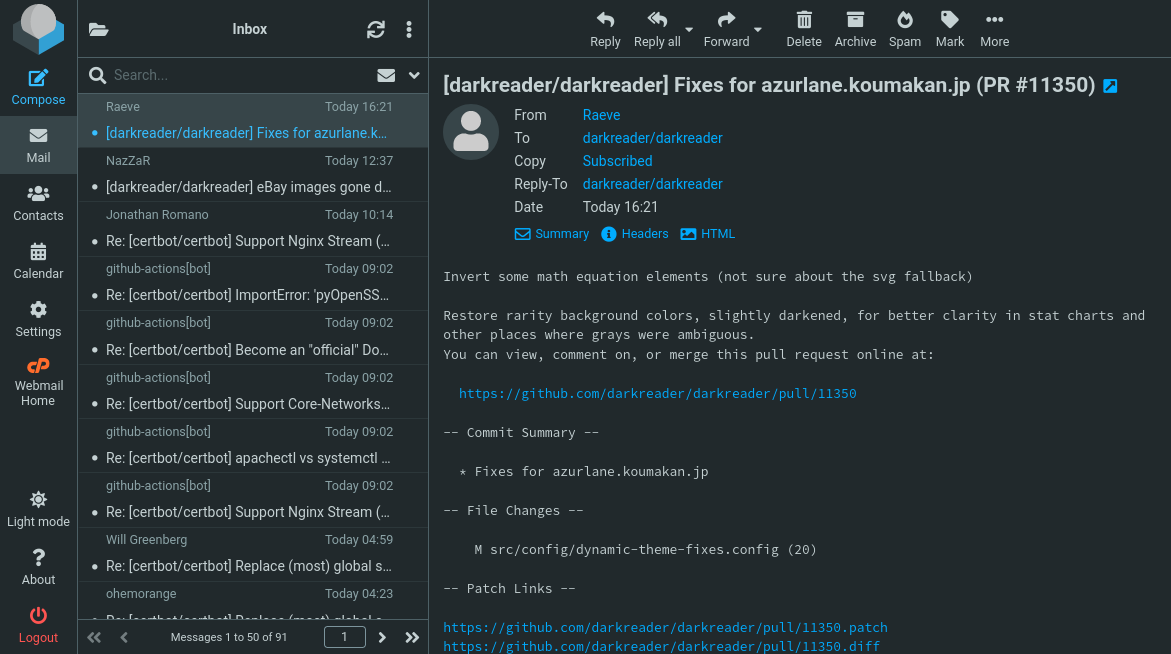
A user's email inbox at Roundcube

Webmail (or web-based email) is an email service that can be accessed using a standard web browser. It contrasts with email service accessible through a specialised email client software. Additionally, many internet service providers (ISP) provide webmail as part of their internet service package. Similarly, some web hosting providers also provide webmail as a part of their hosting package.

As with any web application, webmail's main advantage over the use of a desktop email client is the ability to send and receive email anywhere from a web browser.

== History ==
=== Early implementations ===
The first Web Mail implementation was developed at CERN in 1993 by Phillip Hallam-Baker as a test of the HTTP protocol stack, but was not developed further. In the next two years, however, several people produced working webmail applications.

In Europe, there were three implementations, Søren Vejrum's "WWW Mail", Luca Manunza's "WebMail", and Remy Wetzels' "WebMail". Søren Vejrum's "WWW Mail" was written when he was studying and working at the Copenhagen Business School in Denmark, and was released on February 28, 1995. Luca Manunza's "WebMail" was written while he was working at CRS4 in Sardinia, from an idea of Gianluigi Zanetti, with the first source release on March 30, 1995. Remy Wetzels' "WebMail" was written while he was studying at the Eindhoven University of Technology in the Netherlands for the DSE and was released early January 1995.

In the United States, Matt Mankins wrote "Webex", (Note: No relation to Cisco Webex.) and Bill Fitler, while at Lotus cc:Mail, began working on an implementation which he demonstrated publicly at Lotusphere on January 24, 1995. Customers who saw the cc:Mail demonstration were very enthusiastic, one recalling that they were "like an angry mob. People were yelling, 'We want this now!'". Matt Mankins, under the supervision of Dr. Burt Rosenberg at the University of Miami, released his "Webex" application source code in a post to comp.mail.misc on August 8, 1995, although it had been in use as the primary email application at the School of Architecture where Mankins worked for some months prior.

Bill Fitler's webmail implementation was further developed as a commercial product, which Lotus announced and released in the fall of 1995 as cc:Mail for the World Wide Web 1.0; thereby providing an alternative means of accessing a cc:Mail message store (the usual means being a cc:Mail desktop application that operated either via dialup or within the confines of a local area network).

Early commercialization of webmail was also achieved when "Webex" began to be sold by Mankins' company, DotShop, Inc., at the end of 1995. Within DotShop, "Webex" changed its name to "EMUmail"; which would be sold to companies like UPS and Rackspace until its sale to Accurev in 2001. EMUmail was one of the first applications to feature a free version that included embedded advertising, as well as a licensed version that did not.

Hotmail and Four11's RocketMail both launched in 1996 as free services and immediately became very popular.

=== Widespread deployment ===
As the 1990s progressed, and into the 2000s, it became more common for the general public to have access to webmail because:

- many Internet service providers (such as EarthLink) and web hosting providers (such as Verio) began bundling webmail into their service offerings (often in parallel with POP/SMTP services);
- many other enterprises (such as universities and large corporations) also started offering webmail as a way for their user communities to access their email (either locally managed or outsourced);
- webmail service providers (such as Hotmail and RocketMail) emerged in 1996 as a free service to the general public, and rapidly gained in popularity.

In some cases, webmail application software is developed in-house by the organizations running and managing the application, and in some cases it is obtained from software companies that develop and sell such applications, usually as part of an integrated mail server package (an early example being Netscape Messaging Server). The market for webmail application software has continued into the 2010s.

== Rendering and compatibility ==
Email users may find the use of both a webmail client and a desktop client using the POP3 protocol presents some difficulties. For example, email messages that are downloaded by the desktop client and are removed from the server will no longer be available on the webmail client. The user is limited to previewing messages using the web client before they are downloaded by the desktop email client. However, one may choose to leave the emails on the server, in which case this problem does not occur. The use of both a webmail client and a desktop client using the IMAP4 protocol allows the contents of the mailbox to be consistently displayed in both the webmail and desktop clients and any action the user performs on messages in one interface will be reflected when the email is accessed via the other interface. There are significant differences in rendering capabilities for many popular webmail services such as Gmail, Outlook.com and Yahoo! Mail. Due to the varying treatment of HTML tags, such as <style> and <head>, as well as CSS rendering inconsistencies, email marketing companies rely on older web development techniques to send cross-platform mail. This usually means a greater reliance on tables and inline stylesheets.

Microsoft Windows applications by default create email messages via MAPI. Several vendors produce tools to provide a MAPI interface to webmail.

== Privacy concerns ==
Although emails stored unencrypted on any service provider's servers can be read by that service provider, specific concerns have been raised regarding webmail services that automatically analyze the contents of users' emails for the purpose of targeted advertising. At least two such services, Gmail and Yahoo! Mail, give users the option to opt out of targeted advertising.

Webmail that is accessed over unsecured HTTP may be readable by a third party who has access to the data transmission, such as over an unsecured Wi-Fi connection. This may be avoided by connecting to the webmail service via HTTPS, which encrypts the connection. Gmail has supported HTTPS since launch and in 2014 began requiring it for all webmail connections. Yahoo! Mail added the option to connect over HTTPS in 2013 and made HTTPS required in 2014.

== See also ==
- Comparison of email clients
- Comparison of mail servers
- Comparison of webmail providers
- Email hosting service
- Hybrid mail
