= Windows Contacts =

Legacy contact manager included with Microsoft Windows

- Contacts folder inside Windows Explorer, showing example contacts.
- Developer: Microsoft
- Operating system: Microsoft Windows
- Predecessor: Windows Address Book
- Successor: People
- Website: windowshelp.microsoft.com/Windows/de-DE/Help/26ce0593-f146-454e-92a2-5fe1107da4b01031.mspx

Windows Contacts
- Filename extension: .contact
- Internet media type: text/x-ms-contact
- Developed by: Microsoft
- Type of format: electronic business card
- Container for: contact information
- Extended from: XML
- Website: Windows Contacts

Windows Contacts is a legacy special folder used for contact management that is included in Windows Vista, Windows 7, Windows 8, Windows 10, and Windows 11. It replaced but retains most of the functionality of Windows Address Book and works with Windows Live Mail and the Vista version of Windows Mail for legacy purposes.

Windows Contacts uses an XML-based schema format. Each contact appears as an individual .contact file, in which custom information including pictures can be stored. Windows Contacts features extensibility APIs for integration with other applications and for storing custom information. The legacy *.wab format and the open standards *.vcf (vCard) and *.csv (CSV) are also supported.

Although it's incompatible with and functionally replaced by the newer People app and then later by Outlook for Windows, the folder still exists in the latest versions of Windows for backwards compatibility.

== Features ==
- Windows Contacts is implemented as a special folder that's found in a user's folder. It's also found in the Start Menu of Windows Vista as a shortcut and can be run in Windows 7 and Windows 10 by searching for 'Contacts' (or 'wab.exe') in the Start Menu. Contacts can be stored in folders and groups.
- It can import vCard, CSV, WAB and LDIF formats.
- It can export in vCard 2.1 and CSV formats. Users can right-click a contact to quickly convert it to vCard format and send it to anyone.
- It can print contacts in Memo, Business Card, and Phone List formats.
- Because contacts are stored in the Contacts folder simply as individual .contact files, they're just another data type in the operating system that can be indexed and searched by Windows Search. Individual contacts can be quickly accessed from the Start menu search text box.
- People, the contact manager for Outlook.com can store its information in the Windows Contacts folder if the option to encrypt it is unchecked in Windows Live Messenger. Whenever contacts in Messenger are updated, they'll be updated in Windows Contacts as well. This feature however only works up to Windows Live Messenger 8.5. Windows Contacts synchronization is not supported in Windows Live Messenger 9.0.
- Windows Contacts exposes APIs for creating new contacts, reading and writing in an existing contact, adding a "Label" in the form of a URI to a "Property" or a "Property" to a "Contact", API for synchronizing devices with Windows Contacts.

== Outlook Express Export Bug ==
There is a known problem when exporting the Windows Address Book (*.wab) files to another PC. If the user has contacts organized into folders, this folder structure will not be preserved when the WAB file is imported. All contacts will be preserved, however, leaving some with a considerable task of manually reconstructing the folders and moving addresses back into their rightful places. See: http://support.microsoft.com/kb/249670

A solution for Windows versions still using WAB files as their address book is to copy, not export/import, the WAB files to their correct location. This often preserves the folder structure. Unfortunately, in Windows Live Mail this does not work as WLM doesn't use WAB.

== See also ==
- People
- Microsoft Office Outlook
- Lightweight Directory Access Protocol
- File Explorer
