= AWF =

AWF may refer to:

- African Wildlife Foundation, a conservation NGO
- Africa Wrestling Federation, the former name of the Africa Wrestling Alliance
- Alabama Wildlife Federation, a nonprofit organization
- Airplane wingsuit formation
- Amazingly Workable Formatter, a text formatting program (see nroff)
- American Wrestling Federation, a defunct professional wrestling promotion based in Chicago
- Australasian Wrestling Federation
- Australian Wrestling Federation, an Australian professional wrestling promotion
- Apocalypse Wrestling Federation, a Canadian professional wrestling promotion based in Toronto
- AWF, Microsoft at Work Fax file format
