= Contact manager =

Software program for contact information

A contact manager is a software program that enables users to easily store and find contact information, such as names, addresses and telephone numbers. They are databases that provide an integrated approach to tracking information and communication activities linked to contacts. Simple ones for personal use are included in most smartphones. Sophisticated contact managers provide calendar sharing features and allow colleagues to access the same database.

== History ==
Contact lists have been available for a long time. An early contact management system was Exsell for DOS by Excalibur Sources, released in 1984.

Microsoft Windows has included different contact managers over time: Cardfile, Windows Address Book, Windows Contacts, People and Outlook for Windows.

== Benefits ==
A contact management system may be chosen because it is thought to provide the following advantages:

- Centralized repository of contact information
- Ready-to-use database with searching
- Sales tracking
- Email integration
- Scheduling of appointments and meetings
- Document management
- Notes and conversation management
- Customizable fields
- Import/export utility
- Contact sharing

== Differences from customer relationship management ==
Traditionally, a contact manager is usually used for instances where the sales interaction model of the organization is a one-to-many interaction model, in which a single sales representative is responsible for multiple roles within a company. Alternatively, a company with a many-to-many interaction model, in which many sales representatives are targeting a single job role, a customer relationship management system is preferred.

However, most recent contact management solutions are fully adapted to many-to-many interactions models, and the difference between a CRM and a contact manager starts to lay more on the fact that CRMs are commonly used to automate sales and marketing processes (quotes, invoices, reminder emails, etc.) where contacts management solutions focus on a people-centric approach which goal is to centralize all contact information within an organization and have better control on who can access this data and how it is accessed.

== See also ==
- Address Book
- Automated online assistant
- Business intelligence
- Business relationship management
- Comparison of CRM systems
- Consumer relationship system
- Contact list
- Customer experience transformation
- Customer experience
- Customer intelligence
- Customer service – contains ISO standards
- Data management
- Data mining
- Database marketing
- E-crm
- Enterprise feedback management (EFM)
- Event-driven marketing (EDM)
- Farley File
- Help desk
- Mystery shopping
- Partner relationship management (PRM)
- Predictive analytics
- Professional services automation software (PSA)
- Public relations
- Real-time marketing
- Sales force management system
- Sales intelligence
- Sales process engineering
- Supplier relationship management
- Support automation
- The International Customer Service Institute – contains customer service standards
- Vendor relationship management or VRM
- vCalendar (main "calendar interchange" standard)
- vCard (main "contact interchange" standard)
