= People (software) =

Contact management app and address book in Windows 8 and 10

- Developer: Microsoft
- Stable release: 10.2202.100.0
- Operating system: Windows 8, 8.1, 10; Windows Phone 7, 8, 8.1, 10
- Predecessor: Windows Contacts
- Successor: Outlook for Windows
- License: Proprietary
- Website: people.live.com

People was a contact management app and address book included in Microsoft's Windows 8 and 10. It allows a user to organize and link contacts from different email accounts. People has a unique graphical interface, unlike Windows Contacts' File Explorer-based interface, based on the Metro design language that had already been used for Outlook.com and the integrated online People service. In addition to being an address book, it provides a list of recent mail conversations with a selected contact. It used to also be a social media hub, in which users could integrate their social networking accounts (e.g. Twitter), but API changes in both Windows and social media services caused this functionality to break.

People worked with other Metro-style apps, but it had its own front-end interface and could be opened by end users. Unlike Windows Contacts, it did not currently allow users to import or export .pst files, vCard files, Windows Address Book files, or other files directly. Instead, it gathered contact information from email accounts the user has set up on other services in Windows, such as Mail and Calendar, Skype Preview, or the Xbox app. Changes, additions, and deletions made in the People app would be exported to the corresponding email accounts. Users could select which accounts should display contact info in People.

The People app supported Outlook.com People, Google Contacts, iCloud contacts, Yahoo! contacts, and other contact lists that could be imported by logging into an email account.

== Development ==
The first version of People was a text-heavy app added to Windows 8 as one of many apps written to run full-screen or snapped as part of Microsoft's Metro design language philosophy. It is one of three apps on Windows that originate from Microsoft Outlook, from which the Mail and Calendar apps also originate. Structurally, the three apps were one, but each had its own user interface. Like many Microsoft apps introduced for Windows 8, many of the features and controls were hidden in the Charms Bar or a menu at the bottom of the screen that was triggered by right clicking and it relies on horizontal scrolling through sets of lists. When a user with a Microsoft account added an email account on one computer with Windows 8 People, the account would be automatically added to all other Windows 8 computers the user is logged into.

During the initial development of Windows 10, Microsoft deprecated the functionality of the Windows 8 Mail, Calendar, and People apps. It rebuilt the apps with new Windows 10 APIs later in development. While Mail and Calendar were rebuilt as one underlying app, the new People is now a separate app that still interacts with Mail and Calendar.

An early concept image for Windows 10's People app show the hamburger menu and history feature, neither of which were present in the initial release of Windows 10. It also shows three features that have not been released: a what's new panel, a link to a messaging app, and a section for managing group contacts. It is unknown if these features are still planned.

Although People replicates much of the functionality of Windows Contacts, it is not a true replacement, as Contacts still exists and functions properly in the most recent release of Windows 10. Some apps, including Mail and Calendar, formerly used Windows Contacts to manage contacts but switched to using People to manage contacts.

Support for Windows Mail, Calendar, and People ended on December 31, 2024.

== See also ==
- Windows Address Book
- Windows Contacts
- Microsoft Outlook
- Outlook.com
- Lightweight Directory Access Protocol
