= Email production =

Process of building HTML email

The term email production is used in advertising and marketing to refer to the process of building HTML email from "creative" mockup images built by web designers.

The production of an email would appear to be a simple task; one starts with a picture of the advertisement to be emailed - usually in JPEG, GIF, or PSD format - and transforms it into another medium (HTML). The act of making this transformation would also appear to overlap with web design itself, as the advertising email is basically a small, one-page HTML application. However, the medium over which this page is typically rendered is significantly different from the standard browser model in several important ways, each of which distinguish email production from standard webpage coding. First, the email equivalent of the cross-browser problem is much larger in scope when one considers the variety of email rendering clients in common usage. A highly abbreviated list of the most common clients includes Outlook 2003, Outlook 2007, Outlook Express, Mac Mail, Lotus Notes, Eudora, and web-based clients like Gmail, Hotmail, or Yahoo! Mail. This situation is complicated by the lack of a recognized body like the W3C to institute rendering standards. Attempts at such standards do currently exist, like the Email Standards Project, but such efforts are hampered by competing motivations in light of the ongoing spam email problem.

The increasing struggle of legitimate advertisers to distinguish their message from spam emails makes email production engineers being familiar with the latest anti-spam requirements more critical. Such familiarity includes not only an understanding of the CAN-SPAM Act of 2003 and its requirements, but also an understanding of how to construct advertisements such that they do not trigger SPAM scores.

The rapid pace of email client development requires a more attentive eye for detail in email production than for web. The prominence of mobile email clients increases this challenge. This advancement, coupled with the lack of standards, requires that an email production engineer be familiar with the concept of elegant degradation, as commonly intended rendering of the product will fail at least partially. This requires a different design philosophy from webpage coding, in which the ultimate coding goal - to ensure 100% compatibility with all available rendering media - is attainable. There are several tools available such as Litmus.com and EmailonAcid.com to help preview how an email will render in multiple email clients and mobile devices.

As a result of these other differences, the best practices associated with email production is very different from that associated with webpage coding. For instance, the tableless web design which is often considered the gold standard for internet applications is for email production purposes hopelessly reliant upon W3C standards that are rarely met by today's most common email clients. In practice, therefore, the use of tables is a fundamental requirement of proper technique for email production, in order to ensure that emails are rendered to their recipient with some degree of control.
