= Calendar (Windows) =

Application of Microsoft windows

Windows Calendar

- Calendar running on Windows 10, using the light theme
- Developer: Microsoft
- Release: 24 November 2014; 11 years ago
- Stable release: 16005.14326.22342.0 / 9 April 2025; 14 months ago
- Operating system: Microsoft Windows
- Predecessor: Windows Live Mail
- Type: electronic calendar

Windows Calendar is a personal calendar application made by Microsoft for Microsoft Windows. It offers synchronization of calendars using Microsoft Exchange Server, Outlook.com, Apple's iCloud calendar service, and Google Calendar.

== History ==
Microsoft first included a Calendar application (shortened to app) in Windows 1.0, which was included through Windows 3.1, and was replaced by Schedule+ in Windows for Workgroups and Windows NT 3.1. Schedule+ was later moved from Windows to the Microsoft Office suite, and Windows did not include another Calendar application until Windows Calendar in Windows Vista. Calendar had been created by Beta 2 of Windows Vista.

=== Windows Vista ===
This version supports sharing, subscribing, and publishing of calendars on WebDAV-enabled web servers and network shares. It has always supported .ics files, and the subscription feature enables syncing with Google Calendar. Its interface matches Windows Vista Mail's, but the two apps are not connected in this operating system. The default calendar can be renamed.

On the calendar taskbar applet, there is a date grid on the left side and a skeuomorphistic analogue clock and a digital clock underneath on the right side. Additional clocks displaying different time zones can be added to the view. On the date grid (left side), dates far in the past or future can be looked up by zooming out by clicking on the date range indicator above the calendar grid, until each tile is a decade (e.g. 2010-2019, 2020-2029).

This version has later been inherited on Windows 7.

=== Windows 8 ===
A new version of Calendar with a text-heavy design was added to Windows 8 as one of many apps written to run full-screen or snapped as part of Microsoft's Metro design language philosophy. It is one of three apps on Windows that originate from Microsoft Outlook, the other two being Mail and People apps. Structurally, the three apps are one and are installed and uninstalled as such, though each has its own user interface. Calendar in Windows 8 originally supported Outlook.com, Exchange, Google Calendar, and Facebook calendars. Because of API changes, Facebook and Google calendars can no longer be directly synced on Windows 8. Like many Microsoft apps introduced for Windows 8, many of the features are hidden in the charms or a menu at the bottom of the screen that is triggered by right-clicking. Different calendars can be labeled with different colors. When a user with a Microsoft account adds a calendar account on one computer with Windows 8 Calendar, the account will be automatically added to all other Windows 8 computers the user is logged into. .ics files are not supported in this version.

=== Windows 10 ===
Calendar had preset server configurations for Outlook.com, Exchange, Google Calendar, and iCloud Calendar. Users could set it to use the system theme or choose a custom accent color, background image, and light/dark preference. Windows 10 Calendar had multi-window support for viewing and editing events. Different calendars could be labeled with different colors, and events could be rearranged by dragging and dropping. The default interface was Month View, but users could also use Day, Week, and Year views and print these views. The Windows 10 app also used a flyout settings panel and a mini Ribbon interface in the viewing pane. The day of the year and calendar events show on the live tile. Like the Vista version, the important controls were readily visible and used icons to match the system's. Accounts could be grouped and relabeled, but folders could not be edited from within the app. .ics support was added to this version in time for the Windows 10 Anniversary Update.

Support for Windows Mail, Calendar, and People ended on December 31, 2024. Users are no longer able to send and receive emails or events using Windows Mail and Calendar.

== See also ==
- Features new to Windows Vista
- Features new to Windows 8
- Features new to Windows 10
- SyncML open standard for calendar syncing
