= EPrompter =

ePrompter
- Developer(s): Tiburon Technology, Inc.
- Initial release: 2000
- Stable release: 2.0 (SR120) / August 29, 2008; 16 years ago
- Operating system: Windows
- Type: E-mail notification
- Website: eprompter.com

ePrompter is a freeware e-mail notification program that, along with POP3, supports most popular webmail services as well as many older or less popular ones. It automatically checks multiple email accounts (up to 16) at regular intervals - the default period is 15 minutes, or manually at any time. It also permits users, after reading, to reply to emails received with simple text-only messages.

In its heyday, ePrompter was highly recommended.

Dave Fishman of The Johns Hopkins News-Letter called it, "[t]he best e-mail program ever."

Charles Bermant of the Seattle Times called ePrompter the "Product of the Year" in 2001.

From 2008 onwards, there were many compatibility problems with Hotmail, Yahoo! Mail, Gmail and Windows Live Mail accounts, which reduced its usefulness considerably. The 3.0 beta version was promised to users on the ePrompter website for several years until the forum was closed down in 2016.

It is not clear why the developers never released version 3.0 and there appears to be no future prospect of their doing so although, as of 2021, the website still bears a message stating that development work is ongoing.
