= WLO =

WLO may refer to:

== Transport ==
- Waterloo railway station (Merseyside), UK (National Rail station code)
- West London Orbital, a proposed railway line in London, UK
- Winslow station (Arizona), US (Amtrak station code)

== Computing ==
- White Label Office, a software program based on OpenOffice.org
- Windows Libraries for OS/2
- Wonderland Online, an MMORPG developed by IGG for Windows

== Other uses ==
- WLO is a Marine Coastal Radio Station in Mobile, Alabama
