= Fiscal year =

One-year term for government and business financial reporting

A fiscal year (also known as a financial year, or sometimes budget year) is a one-year time interval whose beginning and end may be shifted with respect to the calendar year (1 January to 31 December). In the Northern Hemisphere, the most common shifted fiscal year is July to the next June, but other practices exist, such as April to the next March. For countries in the Southern Hemisphere, the fiscal year normally coincides with the calendar year, January to December. The series of consecutive fiscal years forms a calendar system known as a fiscal calendar. The names of fiscal years are often shortened based on the calendar year in which they end; for example, "FY24" is an abbreviation for "fiscal year 2023-2024".

It is used in governmental accounting, which varies between countries, and for budget purposes. It is also used for financial reporting by businesses and other organizations. Laws in many jurisdictions require company financial reports to be prepared and published on an annual basis. Taxation laws generally require accounting records to be maintained and taxes calculated on an annual basis, which usually corresponds to the fiscal year used for government purposes. The calculation of tax on an annual basis is especially relevant for direct taxes, such as income tax. Many annual government fees—such as council tax and license fees—are also levied on a fiscal year basis, but others are charged on an anniversary basis.

Some companies, such as Cisco Systems, end their fiscal year on the same day of the week each year: the day that is closest to a particular date (for example, the Friday closest to 31 December). Under such a system, some fiscal years have 52 weeks and others 53 weeks.

The calendar year is used as the fiscal year by about 65% of publicly traded companies in the United States and for most large corporations in the United Kingdom. That is the case in many countries around the world with a few exceptions such as Australia, New Zealand, and Japan.

Many universities have a fiscal year which ends during the summer to align the fiscal year with the academic year, and universities are typically quieter during the summer months. In a similar fashion, many nonprofit performing arts organizations will have a fiscal year which ends during the summer, so that their performance season that begins in the fall and ends in the spring will be within one fiscal year.

Some media/communication-based organizations use a broadcast calendar as the basis for their fiscal year.

== Chart of various fiscal years ==
Start date of fiscal year by country
Country	Purpose	(Jul)	(Aug)	(Sep)	(Oct)	(Nov)	(Dec)	Jan	Feb	Mar	Apr	May	Jun	Jul	Aug	Sep	Oct	Nov	Dec	(Jan)	(Feb)	(Mar)
Australia																						
Austria																						
Bangladesh																						
Belgium																						
Brazil																						
Canada	government																					
Canada	corporate/personal																					
China																						
Costa Rica																						
Croatia																						
Egypt																						
Ethiopia		8 July																				
France																						
Germany																						
Greece																						
Hong Kong																						
India																						
Indonesia																						
Iran										21 March												
Ireland																						
Israel																						
Italy	corporate/government																					
Japan	corporate/government																					
Japan	personal																					
Kenya																						
Latvia																						
Lithuania																						
Malaysia																						
Mexico																						
Moldova																						
Mongolia																						
Nepal		16 July																				
Netherlands																						
New Zealand	government																					
New Zealand	corporate/personal																					
Norway																						
Pakistan																						
Philippines																						
Portugal																						
Qatar																						
Romania																						
Russia																						
Singapore	government																					
Singapore	personal																					
South Africa																						
South Korea																						
Spain	corporate/government																					
Sweden																						
Switzerland																						
Taiwan																						
Thailand																						
Turkey																						
United Arab Emirates																						
United Kingdom	personal										6 April											
United Kingdom	corporate/government																					
United States	federal																					
United States	most states																					
United States	corporate/personal																					
Country	Purpose	(Jul)	(Aug)	(Sep)	(Oct)	(Nov)	(Dec)	Jan	Feb	Mar	Apr	May	Jun	Jul	Aug	Sep	Oct	Nov	Dec	(Jan)	(Feb)	(Mar)

== Tax year ==
The fiscal year for individuals and entities to report and pay income taxes is often known as the taxpayer's tax year or taxable year. Taxpayers in many jurisdictions may choose their tax year. Some federal countries, such as Canada and Switzerland, require the provincial or cantonal tax year to align with the federal year. In the United States, most states retained a 30 June fiscal year-end date when the federal government switched to 30 September in 1976. Nearly all jurisdictions require that the tax year be 12 months or 52/53 weeks. However, short years are permitted as the first year or when changing tax years.

Most countries require all individuals to pay income tax based on the calendar year. Significant exceptions include:

- Australia: individuals pay income tax based on the financial year of 1 July until 30 June.
- United Kingdom: the tax year for individuals begins on 6 April. This is due to Britain historically having a calendar year starting on Lady Day (25 March) in the Julian calendar but a fiscal year ending on that day. When the UK adopted the Gregorian calendar in 1752, 25 March translated to 5 April and 26 March to 6 April. (See History of taxation in the United Kingdom#Start of tax year for more detailed explanation.)
- United States: individuals may (but rarely do) elect any tax year, subject to IRS approval.

Many jurisdictions require that the tax year conform to the taxpayer's fiscal year for financial reporting. The United States is a notable exception: taxpayers may choose any tax year, but must keep books and records for such year.

== Operation by jurisdiction ==
In some jurisdictions, particularly those that permit tax consolidation, companies that are part of a group of businesses must use nearly the same fiscal year (differences of up to three months are permitted in some jurisdictions, such as the US and Japan), with consolidating entries to adjust for transactions between units with different fiscal years, so the same resources will not be counted more than once or not at all.

=== Afghanistan ===
In Afghanistan, from 2011 to 2021, the fiscal year began on 1 Hamal (20th or 21 March). The fiscal year aligned with the Persian or Solar Hijri calendar used in Afghanistan at the time.

=== Australia ===
In Australia, a fiscal year is commonly called a "financial year" (FY), and starts on 1 July, ending on 30 June the next year. Financial years are designated by the calendar year of the second half of the period. For example, financial year 2027 is the 12-month period ending on 30 June 2027 and can be referred to as FY2026/27. It is used for official purposes, by individual taxpayers and by the overwhelming majority of business enterprises. Business enterprises may opt to use a financial year that ends at the end of a week (e.g., 52 or 53 weeks in length, and therefore is not exactly one calendar year in length), or opt for its financial year to end on a date that matches the reporting cycle of its foreign parent. All entities within the one group must use the same financial year.

For government accounting and budget purposes, pre-Federation colonies changed the financial year from the calendar year to a year ending 30 June on the following dates: Victoria changed in 1870, South Australia in 1874, Queensland in 1875, Western Australia in 1892, New South Wales in 1895 and Tasmania in 1904. The Commonwealth adopted the near-ubiquitous financial year standard since its inception in 1901. The reason given for the change was for convenience, as Parliament typically sits during May and June, while it was difficult for it to meet in November and December to pass a budget.

The financial year is split into four quarters which cover the following periods:

Quarter	Period covered
Quarter 1	1 Jul – 30 Sep
Quarter 2	1 Oct – 31 Dec
Quarter 3	1 Jan – 31 Mar
Quarter 4	1 Apr – 30 Jun

=== Austria ===
In Austria, the fiscal year is the calendar year, 1 January to 31 December.

=== Bangladesh ===
In Bangladesh, the fiscal year is 1 July to the next 30 June.

=== Belarus ===
In Belarus, the fiscal year is the calendar year, 1 January to 31 December.

=== Brazil ===
In Brazil, the fiscal year is the calendar year, 1 January to 31 December.

=== Bulgaria ===
In Bulgaria, the fiscal year is the calendar year, 1 January to 31 December, both for personal income tax and for corporate taxes.

=== Canada ===
In Canada, the government's financial year is 1 April to 31 March.
(Q1 1 April – 30 June, Q2 1 July – 30 Sept, Q3 1 Oct – 31 Dec and Q4 1 Jan – 31 Mar)

For individual taxpayers, the fiscal year is the calendar year, 1 January to 31 December.

=== China ===
In China, the fiscal year for all entities is the calendar year, 1 January to 31 December, and applies to the tax year, statutory year, and planning year.

=== Colombia ===
In Colombia, the fiscal year is the calendar year, 1 January to 31 December.

=== Costa Rica ===
In Costa Rica, the fiscal year is the calendar year. January to December. As of 2019 when the tax laws changed.

=== Egypt ===
In Egypt, the fiscal year is 1 July to 30 June.

=== France ===
In France, the fiscal year is the calendar year, 1 January to 31 December, and has been since at least 1911.

=== Germany ===
In Germany, the fiscal year runs from 1 January until 31 December.

=== Greece ===
In Greece, the fiscal year is the calendar year, 1 January to 31 December.

=== Hong Kong ===
In Hong Kong, the government's financial year runs from 1 April to 31 March.

However, a company incorporated in Hong Kong can determine its own financial year-end, which may be different from the government fiscal year.

=== India ===
In India, the government's financial year runs from 1 April to 31 March the following year. The financial year from 1 April 2026 to 31 March 2027 would generally be abbreviated as FY 2026–27 or( FY26-27) ( FY2026/27),(FY2026/2027),(FY26/27), but it may also be called FY 2027 or FY27 on the basis of the ending year.

Companies following the Indian Depositary Receipt (IDR) are given freedom to choose their financial year. For example, Standard Chartered's IDR follows the UK calendar despite being listed in India. Companies following Indian fiscal year get to know their economic health on 31 March of every Indian financial or fiscal year.

The current fiscal year was adopted by the colonial British government in 1867 to align India's financial year with that of the British Empire. Prior to 1867, India followed a fiscal year that ran from 1 May to 30 April.

On 4 May 2017, Madhya Pradesh announced that it would move to a January–December financial year, becoming the first Indian state to do so. But later it dropped the idea due to many financial and accounting errors.

=== Indonesia ===
In Indonesia, since 2001, the fiscal year is the calendar year, 1 January to 31 December. Until 2000, the fiscal year ran from 1 April to 31 March; fiscal year 2000 ran from 1 April to 31 December.

=== Iran ===
In Iran, the fiscal year usually starts on 21 or 22 March (1st of Farvardin in the Solar Hejri calendar) and concludes on next year's 20th or 21 March (29th or 30th of Esfand in the Solar Hijri calendar).

=== India ===
In India, the fiscal year or financial year is from 1 April to 31 March.

=== Ireland ===
In Ireland, the fiscal year is the calendar year, 1 January to 31 December. Until 2001, it was the year ending 5 April, as in the United Kingdom, but was changed with the introduction of the euro. The 2001 tax year was nine months, from April to December.

=== Israel ===
In Israel, the fiscal year is the calendar year, 1 January to 31 December.

=== Italy ===
In Italy, the fiscal year is the calendar year, 1 January to 31 December. It was changed in 1965, before which it was 1 July to 30 June.

=== Japan ===
In Japan, the government's financial year is from 1 April to 31 March.

Japan's income tax year is 1 January to 31 December, but corporate tax is charged according to the corporation's own annual period; most Japanese corporations elect their annual period to follow the government fiscal year (1 April to 31 March).

=== Lithuania ===
In Lithuania, the fiscal year is the calendar year, 1 January to 31 December.

=== Macau ===
In Macau, the government's financial year is 1 January to 31 December.

=== Malaysia ===
In Malaysia, the tax year for individuals is the calendar year, from 1 January to 31 December.

The Companies Act 2016 does not state when the fiscal year must start for companies, so businesses are free to choose a financial year-end date. Private businesses usually choose the last day of the calendar year or the last day of the quarter for their financial year end.

Generally, the government releases the annual federal budget in October, ahead of the fiscal year.

=== Mexico ===
In Mexico, the fiscal year is the calendar year, 1 January to 31 December.

=== Moldova ===
In Moldova, the fiscal year is the calendar year, 1 January to 31 December.

=== Mongolia ===
In Mongolia, the fiscal year is the calendar year, 1 January to 31 December.

=== Myanmar/Burma ===
In Myanmar, the fiscal year is 1 April to 31 March.

=== Nepal ===
In Nepal, the fiscal year is 16 July (29 Dilā in Nepal Sambat) to 15 July (28 Dilā in Nepal Sambat).

=== New Zealand ===
In New Zealand, the government's fiscal and financial reporting year is 1 July to the next 30 June and applies also to the budget. The company and personal financial year is 1 April to 31 March and applies to company and personal income tax.

=== Pakistan ===
In Pakistan, the government's fiscal year is 1 July of the previous calendar year and concludes on 30 June. Private companies are free to observe their own accounting year, which may not be the same as government's fiscal year.

=== Philippines ===
In the Philippines, the government's fiscal year is the calendar year, from 1 January to 31 December.

The accounting period for the private sector must follow a 12-month fiscal period which can or can not be synchronized with the calendar year. Most Philippine companies end their fiscal years in December or March.

=== Poland ===
In Poland, the fiscal year is the calendar year, from 1 January to 31 December.

=== Portugal ===
In Portugal, the fiscal year is the calendar year, 1 January to 31 December.

=== Qatar ===
In Qatar, the fiscal year is from 1 January to 31 December.

=== Romania ===
In Romania, the fiscal year is the calendar year, 1 January to 31 December.

=== Russia ===
In Russia, the fiscal year is the calendar year, 1 January to 31 December.

=== Saudi Arabia ===
In Saudi Arabia, the fiscal year is the calendar year, 1 January to 31 December.

=== Singapore ===
In Singapore, the fiscal year for the calculation of personal income taxes is 1 January to 31 December.

The fiscal year for the Government of Singapore and many government-linked corporations is 1 April to 31 March.

Corporations and organisations are permitted to select any date as the end of each fiscal year, as long as this date remains constant. However, new companies should consciously choose their financial year end to stretch as much as a duration of 12 months as possible.

=== South Africa ===
In South Africa, the financial year for the Government of South Africa is 1 April to 31 March.

The year of assessment for individuals covers twelve months, 1 March to the final day of February the following year. The Act also provides for certain classes of taxpayers to have a year of assessment ending on a day other than the last day of February. Companies are permitted to have a tax year ending on a date that coincides with their financial year. Many older companies still use a tax year that runs from 1 July to 30 June, inherited from the British system. A common practice for newer companies is to run their tax year from 1 March to the final day of February following, to synchronize with the tax year for individuals.

=== South Korea ===
In South Korea, the fiscal year is the calendar year, 1 January to 31 December.

=== Spain ===
In Spain, the fiscal year is the calendar year, 1 January to 31 December.

=== Sweden ===
In Sweden, the fiscal year for individuals is the calendar year, 1 January to 31 December.

The fiscal year for an organisation is typically one of the following:

- 1 January to 31 December
- 1 May to 30 April
- 1 July to 30 June
- 1 September to 31 August

However, all calendar months are allowed. If an organisation wishes to change into a non-calendar year, permission from the Tax Authority is required.

=== Switzerland ===
In Switzerland, the fiscal year is the calendar year, 1 January to 31 December.

=== Taiwan ===
In Taiwan, the fiscal year is the calendar year, 1 January to 31 December. However, an enterprise may elect to adopt a special fiscal year at the time it is established and can request approval from the tax authorities to change its fiscal year.

=== Thailand ===
In Thailand, the government's fiscal year (FY) is 1 October to 30 September of the following year. For individual taxpayers it is the calendar year, 1 January to 31 December.

=== Turkey ===
In Turkey, the fiscal year is the calendar year, 1 January to 31 December.

=== Ukraine ===
In Ukraine, the fiscal year is the calendar year, 1 January to 31 December.

=== United Arab Emirates ===
In the United Arab Emirates, the fiscal year is the calendar year, 1 January to 31 December.

=== United Kingdom ===
In the United Kingdom, the financial year runs from 1 April to 31 March for the purposes of government financial statements. For personal tax purposes the fiscal year starts on 6 April and ends on 5 April of the next calendar year.

Although United Kingdom corporation tax is charged by reference to the government's financial year, companies can adopt any year as their accounting year: if there is a change in tax rate, the taxable profit is apportioned to financial years on a time basis.

A number of major corporations that were once government-owned, such as BT Group and the National Grid, continue to use the government's financial year, which ends on the last day of March, as they have found no reason to change since privatisation.

The 5 April year end for income tax reflects the old civil and ecclesiastical calendar under which New Year began on 25 March (Lady Day). The difference between the two dates is accounted for by the eleven days omitted in September 1752 due to the Calendar (New Style) Act 1750 by which Great Britain also converted from the Julian Calendar to the Gregorian Calendar. However, although the calendar year finished on 24 March, the tax year finished a day later, on 25 March, the Quarter Day – the traditional day on which debts were settled. (For a fuller explanation about the history of the United Kingdom income tax year and its start date, see History of taxation in the United Kingdom § Start of tax year.)

=== United States ===
==== Federal government ====
In the United States, the fiscal year of the federal government begins 1 October and ends 30 September the following year. The current fiscal year is the fiscal year 2027 and is abbreviated FY27 or FY2026-27. It began 1 October 2026 and will end on 30 September 2027.

For example, the United States government fiscal year 2026-27 is:

United States government fiscal year 2026-27
Quarter	Dates
1st	1 October 2026 – 31 December 2026
2nd	1 January 2027 – 31 March 2027
3rd	1 April 2027 – 30 June 2027
4th	1 July 2027 – 30 September 2027

Fiscal years are used by the United States federal government for accounting purposes.

In 1843, the federal government changed the fiscal year from that of a calendar year (beginning 1 January), to one starting on 1 July. These fiscal years ran from 1 July to 30 June the following year. The current fiscal year of 1 October to 30 September was introduced by the Congressional Budget and Impoundment Control Act of 1974. This created what is known as the "transitional quarter", from 1 July 1976 to 30 September 1976, to allow Congress more time to arrive at budget decisions. The first "modern" fiscal year ran 1 October 1976 to 30 September 1977, and was called fiscal year 1976-77 (abbreviated FY77).

United States government fiscal year 1975-76 and transition period (Historical)
Quarter	Dates
1st	1 July 1975 – 30 September 1975
2nd	1 October 1975 – 31 December 1975
3rd	1 January 1976 – 31 March 1976
4th	1 April 1976 – 30 June 1976
Plus	1 July 1976 – 30 September 1976
FY1977	1 October 1976 – 30 September 1977

==== State governments ====
State governments set their own fiscal year. Forty-seven of the fifty states set their fiscal year to end on 30 June. Three states have fiscal years that are different:

- New York, ends 31 March
- Texas, ends 31 August
- Alabama, ends 30 September

The fiscal year for the Washington, DC government ends on 30 September.

Among the inhabited territories of the United States, most align with the federal fiscal year, ending on 30 September. These include American Samoa, Guam, the Northern Mariana Islands and the US Virgin Islands. Puerto Rico is the exception, with its fiscal year ending on 30 June.

=== Vietnam ===
In Vietnam, the fiscal year is the calendar year, 1 January to 31 December.

== Businesses and organizations ==
The tax year for a business is governed by the fiscal year it chooses. A business may choose any consistent fiscal year that it wants; however, for seasonal businesses such as farming and retail, a good accounting practice is to end the fiscal year shortly after the highest revenue time of year. Consequently, most large agriculture companies end their fiscal years after the harvest season, and most retailers end their fiscal years shortly after the Christmas shopping season. Economist Pamela P. Drake notes that there are cases where businesses choose a year-end which fits with the slower part of their business year. At this point in the year they are likely to hold less inventory than their average daily inventory over the whole year.

== See also ==
- 4–4–5 calendar
