= Reminder software =

Reminder software is a type of time management computer software that is designed to alert the user of important events that they have input to the program. Most programs provide a calendar or list view of events, as well as a reminding technique. Most common reminding techniques are pop-up dialog boxes and auditory alarms.

Events may include birthdays, holidays, anniversaries, various one-time events. Often the software comes with a set of pre-installed events (such as holidays) and allows the user to create custom events.

As software has made the transition to web services, a number of online reminder services have appeared. Users subscribed to those services usually receive their reminders by email or SMS. Context-aware reminder systems can set reminders based on the user's current location.

== See also ==
- Reminders (Apple)
- Cortana Reminders
- Notification system
- Digital calendar
- Personal information manager
