= Cardfile =

Software of personal information manager type

- Screenshot of the Windows 3.1 version of Cardfile
- Original author: Mark Cliggett
- Developer: Microsoft
- Release: November 20, 1985; 40 years ago
- Operating system: Microsoft Windows
- Platform: IA-32, DEC Alpha, MIPS, PowerPC
- Successor: Windows Address Book
- Type: Personal information manager

Cardfile is a personal information manager, with an interface metaphor based on the concepts of index cards, card files, and rolodexes, that was distributed with Microsoft Windows starting from the original version 1.01 until Windows NT 4.0 Server. Cardfile is also included with Windows 98 and Windows Millennium Edition, but has to be installed manually from the installation CD-ROM. Beginning with Windows 3.1, Cardfile supported Object Linking and Embedding. The version supplied with Windows NT versions was a 32-bit application with Unicode support. Both later versions could read .crd files created by previous versions.

Localized versions of Windows may have contained Cardfile under other names, for example repert.exe (Répertoire) for the French language Windows.

== History ==
Cardfile was first released with Windows 1.0 as an application that would allow users to create and flip through index cards containing several lines of free-form text. The original developer was Mark Cliggett, represented by his initials MGC as the first three bytes of the original .crd file format.

Windows 3.0 introduced some minor changes to the Cardfile user interface, changing the application's background from blue to white and adding an access bar below the menu, which displays the current view mode (card view or list view) and the number of cards in the file, as well as providing buttons to quickly move to the previous or next cards in order.

With Windows 3.1, Cardfile received a further update, adding OLE support, which allowed content from other OLE-supporting applications to be included within a Cardfile database. At this time, the file format was updated in order to support the new feature, with the file signature changing to RRG to disambiguate the new .crd file format from the earlier one.

Cardfile was also released as a 32-bit accessory for the early versions of Windows NT, using a modification of the Windows 3.1 file format but changing the signature to DKO and the character width for text data to 16 bits in order to support Unicode.

The Windows 3.1 version of Cardfile was included with Windows 95, 98, and ME, but not installed by default. For the later two versions of Windows, the user would have to manually copy the Cardfile application from the Windows install CD in order to use the application.

=== Versions ===
- 16-bit (1.01) – File size 36,588 bytes.
- 16-bit (2.00) – File size 39,440 bytes.
- 16-bit (2.03) – File size 39,264 bytes.
- 16-bit (3.0) – File size: 53,952 bytes; Date stamp: 10-31-90; Confirmed in: Windows 3.0a, Windows 3.0 MME
- 16-bit (WLO) – File size: 78,432 bytes; Date stamp: 09-23-91; Confirmed in: WLO 1.0 Note: recompiled from the Windows 3.0 sources to demonstrate the Windows Libraries for OS/2.
- 16-bit w/ OLE – File size: 93,184 bytes; Date stamp: 12-31-93; Confirmed in: Windows 3.10, 3.11, Windows for Workgroups 3.10, 3.11, Win-OS/2 3.1, Windows 98 SE
- 32-bit – File size: 101,008 bytes; Date stamp: 05-25-95; Confirmed in: Windows NT 3.10, 3.50, 3.51 (diskette and CD-ROM)
- DEC Alpha – File size 148,240 bytes; Date stamp; 05-25-95; Confirmed in: Windows NT 3.51
- MIPS – File size 156,432 bytes; Date stamp; 05-25-95; Confirmed in: Windows NT 3.51
- PPC – File size 171,280; Date stamp 05-25-95; Confirmed in: Windows NT 3.51

== Replacements ==
Microsoft never released a program to replace Cardfile following the discontinuation of its development. However, Schedule+, which appeared with Windows for Workgroups, and Outlook Express, which appeared with Windows 98, have built-in contact managers which can replace Cardfile's use as a contact manager. Schedule+ also had the ability to import Cardfile .crd files through its Import/Export Add-on pack.

Third party applications exist which support opening or modification of Cardfile files for Linux or online.

== Running under later Windows versions ==
The 16-bit Windows 3.1 version of Cardfile (file version 3.10.0.103) can run on all x86-based 32-bit versions of Windows including both Windows 10 Home and Pro 32-bit. Version 3.10.0.103 was included on the Windows 98 and Windows Millennium Edition installation CD but was not installed by default.

In 64-bit versions of Windows, the 32-bit version from Windows NT 3.51 has to be used and will run on both Windows 11 Home and Pro. It supports long file names and has some support for Unicode characters. At the time of NT 3.51 development in the late 1980s, Unicode was fixed-format 2 bytes, now known as UCS-2 and considered obsolete as the later 1996 implementation of UTF-16 allowed for variable-length formatting. Therefore NT 3.51 will reveal its shortcomings for those cardfile cards containing variable-length encoded characters, as such characters will not display properly.
