= Outlook Express =

Microsoft e-mail client software

- Screenshot of Outlook Express in Windows XP
- Developer: Microsoft
- Release: 13 August 1996; 30 years ago
- Operating system: Windows 3.x—Windows XP/Windows Server 2003; Mac System 7—Mac OS 9
- Platform: Microsoft Windows, classic Mac OS
- Type: Email client, newsreader
- License: Proprietary
- Website: support.microsoft.com/kb/835830

Outlook Express, formerly known as Microsoft Internet Mail and News, was an email and news client included with Internet Explorer versions 3.0 to 6.0. As such, it was bundled with several versions of Microsoft Windows, from Windows 98 to Windows Server 2003, and was available for Windows 3.x, Windows NT 3.51, Windows 95, Mac System 7, Mac OS 8, and Mac OS 9. In Windows Vista, Outlook Express was superseded by Windows Mail.

Outlook Express is a different application from Microsoft Outlook. The two programs do not share a common codebase, but they do share a common architectural philosophy. The similar names lead many people to conclude incorrectly that Outlook Express is a stripped-down version of Microsoft Outlook. Outlook Express uses the Windows Address Book to store contact information and integrates tightly with it.

== History ==
Microsoft Internet Mail and News

Version 1.0 was released as Microsoft Internet Mail and News in 1996 following the Internet Explorer 3 release. This add-on precedes the Internet Mail profile for Microsoft Exchange 4.0 bundled in Windows 95. Version 2.0 was released at the end of 1996. Internet Mail and News handled only plain text and rich text (RTF) email, lacking HTML email.

In 1997 the program was changed and renamed to Outlook Express and bundled with Internet Explorer 4. The Windows executable file for Outlook Express, msimn.exe, is a holdover from the Internet Mail and News era. Like Internet Explorer, Outlook Express 4 can run on Mac System 7, OS 8, and OS 9.

Internet Explorer 5 required Outlook Express 5 to save Web Archive files (see MHTML).

Outlook Express 6 is the last version of the software with Outlook branding. It has a similar layout to Outlook Express 5. It was included with Windows XP.

== Supported file formats ==
- .DBX - Outlook Express Email Folder
- .EMAIL - Outlook Express Email Message
- .EML - E-Mail Message
- .IDX - Outlook Express Mailbox Index File
- .MBX - Outlook Express Mailbox
- .MIM - Multi-Purpose Internet Mail Message File
- .MIME - Multi-Purpose Internet Mail Extension
- .MS-TNEF - MS Transport Neutral Encapsulation Format
- .NCH - Outlook Express Folder File
- .ODS - Outlook Express 5 Mailbox (not to be confused with OpenDocument spreadsheet file)
- .OEB - Outlook Express Backup Wizard File
- .PAB - Personal Address Book
- .PST - Outlook Personal Information Store File
- .SIG - Signature File
- .VCF - vCard File
- .WAB - Windows Address Book

== Versions for Windows ==
- Microsoft Internet Mail and News 1.0 was released in 1996 with Internet Explorer 3.
- Microsoft Internet Mail and News 2.0 was released later in 1996.
- Outlook Express 4.0, which was included in Windows 98 (June 1998) and integrated with Internet Explorer 4, stored messages in *.mbx files (similar to the Mbox format used in Unix-based systems).
- Outlook Express 5.0, which was included in Windows 98 Second Edition (June 1999) and integrated with Internet Explorer 5, switched to *.dbx files, with a separate file for each mailbox folder.
- Outlook Express 5.01 was included in Windows 2000 (February 2000) and integrated with Internet Explorer 5.01.
- Outlook Express 5.5 was included in Windows Me (June 2000) and integrated with Internet Explorer 5.5.
- Outlook Express 6.0 was included in Windows XP (October 2001) and integrated with Internet Explorer 6.

== Versions for Mac ==
- Outlook Express 4.0 was included in Microsoft Office 98 Macintosh Edition.
- Outlook Express 5.01 was integrated with Internet Explorer 5.
- Outlook Express 5.01 was bundled with Internet Explorer 5.01.
- Outlook Express 5.5 was bundled with Internet Explorer 5.5.

== Replacements ==
Builds of "Outlook Express 7" appeared in early builds of Windows Vista when in development as "Longhorn". It relied on WinFS for the management and storage of contacts and other data.

The final version of Vista included a successor to Outlook Express known as Windows Mail.

== Criticism ==
=== Email standards ===
Beginning with the text-based Unix Mail command, email traditionally used the inline or bottom posting styles when replying to messages. Outlook Express, as well as Lotus Notes and Microsoft Outlook, top-post (show replies newest to oldest) by default.

Microsoft Outlook and Microsoft Exchange use a proprietary email attachment format called Transport Neutral Encapsulation Format (TNEF) to handle formatting and other features specific to Outlook such as meeting requests. Outlook Express and other email clients are unable to read this format. This can be confusing to Outlook Express users (as well as those who use other email clients) who receive attachments sent from Outlook.

=== Database corruption ===
Outlook Express has been prone to a number of problems which can corrupt its files database, especially when the database increases in size due to an increasing number of stored emails and during database compaction. This has led to a thriving market for software that can back up, restore and recover corrupted files. An open-source project called UnDBX was also created, which seems to be successful in recovering corrupt databases. Microsoft has also released documentation which may be able to correct some non-severe problems and restore access to email messages, without resorting to third-party solutions.

=== Security issues ===
Outlook Express was one of the earlier email clients to support HTML email and scripts. As a result, emails were commonly infected with viruses. Previously, another security flaw was that a script could automatically be opened as an attachment. Another bug was in Outlook Express's attachment handling that allowed an executable to appear to be a harmless attachment such as a graphics file. Opening or previewing the email could cause code to run without the user's knowledge or consent. Outlook Express uses Internet Explorer to render HTML email. Internet Explorer has been subjected to many security vulnerabilities and concerns.

With Outlook Express SP2 (part of Windows XP SP2), Microsoft has tried to correct the security holes. Outlook Express now blocks images inside emails by default. It uses only the restricted security zone for HTML email, which disables scripts and imposes restrictions on what web content can be rendered. It also warns when opening potentially malicious attachments.

=== Handling of PGP/MIME signed messages ===
Outlook Express does not correctly handle MIME, and will not display the body of signed messages inline. Users get a filled email and one attachment (one of the message text and one of the signature) and therefore need to open an attachment to see the email. If the email has been forwarded several times, users need to open attached email messages one inside the other multiple times to reach the parent email message. This bug has still not been rectified. The proper behavior is described in RFC 1847. When replying or forwarding a message to a user who has a digital signature, Outlook Express gives an error and does not allow the user to continue if there is no digital signature installed for the sender.

=== Extensibility ===
Outlook Express does not have a documented object model like Microsoft Outlook. Programmatic access to, or control of Outlook Express for custom messaging applications or plugins is not officially documented or supported by Microsoft. IStoreNamespace and IStoreFolder interfaces were documented in 2003, but they are only related to the storage.

Some companies have managed to create their plugins hacking the interface using Windows hooks. A significant one was the PGP plugin because it was the only example of a working plugin whose source code was available (licensed under GPL). By 2003, some companies provided commercial solutions to develop add-ins.

=== Office 2007 spell checker incompatibility ===
Outlook Express did not have a dedicated spell checker. It used the spell checkers from Microsoft Office if Office was also installed. However, the Office 2007 spell checkers, except for the French spell checker, were incompatible with Outlook Express. Microsoft acknowledged this problem, but did not provide any sort of remedy. There were third party files that fixed the issue, but Microsoft never took action.

=== Glitches and other unusual aspects ===
Cancelling sending an email while it is being sent would not effectively prevent it from being sent. Similarly, when importing .PST files, cancelling the import while it was in progress merely canceled the import of the current folder and the import resumed with the next folder. Furthermore, Outlook Express only supported .dbx files that were smaller than 2 GB, and had performance problems when dealing with files approaching that limit.

== See also ==
- List of Usenet newsreaders
- Comparison of Usenet newsreaders
- Microsoft Mail
- Windows Messaging
- Windows Mail
- Windows Live Mail
- Apple Mail
- Windows 95
