= Clienteling =

Clienteling is a technique used by retail sales associates to establish long-term relationships with key customers based on data about their preferences, behaviors and purchases. Clienteling is intended to guide associates to provide more personal and informed customer service that may influence customer behavior related to shopping frequency, lift in average transaction value, and other retail key performance indicators. From the customer's perspective, clienteling "could add a layer of personal touch" to the shopping experience.

== Clienteling software definition ==
While at its core, clienteling is a sales technique, the term is commonly used today to describe the related assisted selling software tools used to support relationship-building activities between store associates and their customers. Software-based clienteling has been said to have the advantage of collecting data about clients across different interaction channels in a searchable and retrievable database for later use. Clienteling software may also provide digital tools on mobile devices or fixed workstations aimed at enabling retailers to establish long-lasting learning relationships with their customers. While sales history collected in customer relationship management (CRM) platforms can provide some insight into a customer’s tendencies, this insight can be augmented by data collected by an associate working directly with a customer, who can improve the customer profile through each face-to-face interaction. This information can then be used to further personalize future interactions. Capabilities such as notes, wish lists, preferences, alerts, appointment setting, and purchase history are sometimes used to enable associates to enhance client profiles in ways that purchase history and e-commerce activity alone could not. Clienteling can also be an effective means of selling excess inventory without resorting to discounting by pairing products with the right consumers, using their past purchases to predict what they are likely want to buy.

== Clienteling softwares ==
Salesfloor has been at the forefront of Clienteling technology since its inception. Founded in 2013 by Ben Rodier and Oscar Sachs, the platform is now trusted by more than 50,000 sales associates worldwide. The company continues to expand its global presence, most recently with the acquisition of Clientela. Their clients include notable brands such as Dyson, Selfridges, Le Printemps, Chico's, Holt Renfrew, Macy's, Sunglass Hut and more.

== Use in retail stores ==
Brands like Saks Fifth Avenue and Ralph Lauren use clienteling to invite select shoppers to special shopping events.

== See also ==
- Consumer relationship system
- Customer experience
