= Windows Messaging =

Windows email client

- Microsoft Exchange running on Windows 95
- Developer(s): Microsoft
- Stable release: 4.00.835.1374 (version 5.0) / October 14, 1996
- Operating system: Microsoft Windows
- Type: Email client
- License: Proprietary EULA
- Website: Exchange update for Windows 95

Windows Messaging, initially called Microsoft Exchange Client, is an email client that was included with Windows 95 (beginning with OSR2), Windows 98, and Windows NT 4.0.

In Windows 98, it was not installed by default but was available as a separate program in the setup CD. It is incompatible with Windows 2000, Windows ME, Windows XP, and later versions.

== History ==
Microsoft Exchange gained wide usage with the release of Windows 95, as this was the only mail client that came bundled with it. In 1996, it was renamed to Windows Messaging, because of the upcoming release of Microsoft Exchange Server, and continued to be included throughout later releases of Windows up until the initial release of Windows 98, which by then included Outlook Express 4.0 as the default mail client.

The Windows Messaging email client had two branches of successors:

- In software bundled with Windows itself, these were Internet Mail and News in Windows 95 (and bundled with Internet Explorer 3), which was succeeded by Outlook Express 4.0 in Windows 98 (bundled with Internet Explorer 4.0 in Windows 95) and throughout newer Windows systems. These did not use the .pst file type.
- Microsoft Outlook became the professional-grade and more direct successor of MS Exchange Client, which still uses the .pst file type.

== Microsoft Fax ==
Microsoft Fax, also called Microsoft at Work Fax (AWF), is the fax component to provide Send-and-Receive Fax capability; sent and received faxes were stored in the same .pst file as other messages, the first attempt of unified messaging by Microsoft; also the ability to act as fax server, which is not available in later versions of Windows until Windows Vista.

== See also ==
- .pst
- Microsoft Internet Mail and News
- Outlook Express
- Windows Mail
- Microsoft Outlook
- Windows 95 to Windows 98
- Windows Fax and Scan
