= Outlook for Windows =

Personal information manager application

- Other names: New Outlook
- Developer: Microsoft
- Release: September 21, 2023; 3 years ago
- Stable release: 20251205004.10 / December 12, 2025; 11 months ago
- Written in: Microsoft Edge WebView2
- Operating system: Windows 10 and later
- Predecessor: Windows Mail; Windows People
- Type: Personal information manager
- License: Proprietary commercial cloud software
- Website: products.office.com/outlook/outlook-for-windows

Outlook for Windows (also referred to as New Outlook) is an email client and personal information manager developed by Microsoft. It is a replacement for the preloaded Windows Mail and the contact management Windows People app on Windows 10 and 11 and is preinstalled with all versions of Windows 11 since October 2023 (beginning with version 23H2) and Windows 10 since January 2025 (starting with KB5050081).

== History ==
Outlook for Windows was outlined under Microsoft's 'One Outlook' plan, with testing starting in 2022. In September 2023, Microsoft started transitioning users of the previous apps to the new Outlook. It was released on the Microsoft Store that month, although it remained in preview status for enterprise and education users.

== Features ==
Outlook for Windows is a web app based on the WebView2 runtime, and builds on features found in Outlook on the web. It still lacks some features from Microsoft Outlook (which Microsoft refers to as Classic Outlook in this context), such as support for .pst files, which is due to be added at a future date.

The free version includes advertising and allows IMAP accounts to be set up. It does not support iCloud aliases, but it is able to work offline.

== Controversy ==
Outlook for Windows has attracted controversy surrounding the decision to synchronize emails from non-Microsoft accounts with the Microsoft cloud, rather than downloading the email to local devices as previous Outlook clients have done. Concerns have been raised around the privacy implications of such a system.

== See also ==
- Comparison of email clients
- List of Microsoft Windows components
