= Digital calendar =

Electronic version of a calendar

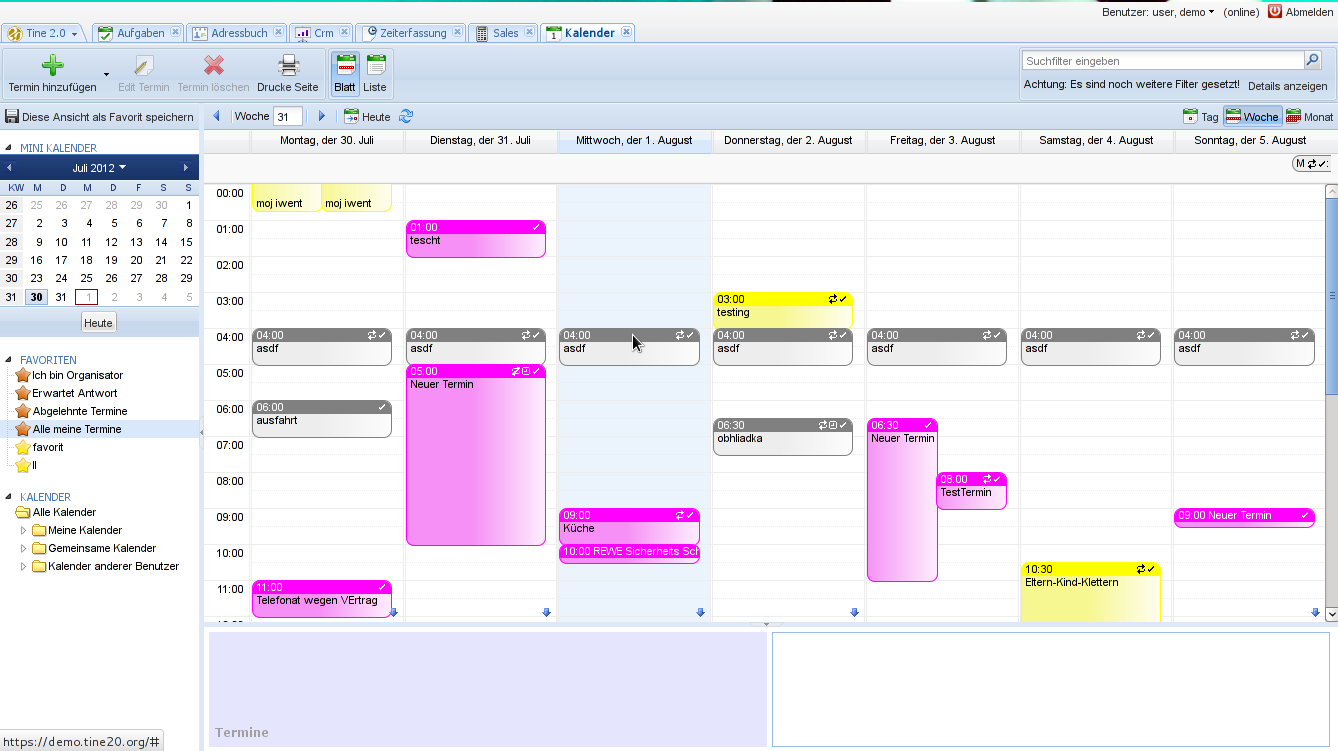
A digital calendar in week view with 24-hour time

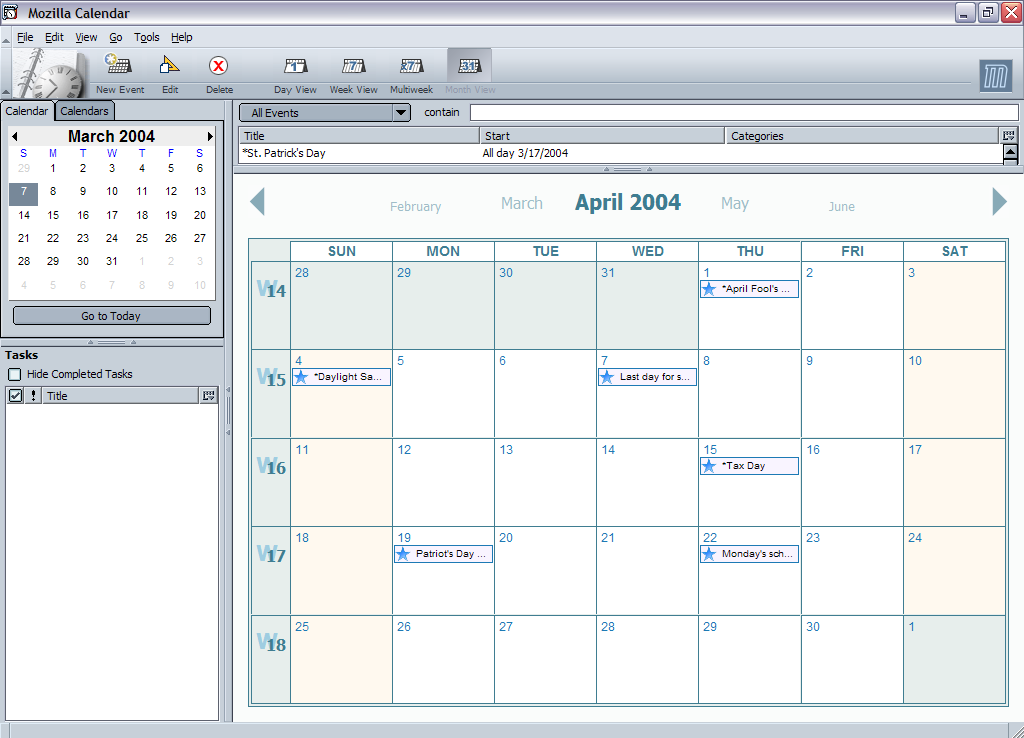
A digital calendar in month view with week numbers

A digital calendar is a collaborative or personal time management software with a calendar that can be used to keep track of planned events. The calendar can also contain an appointment book, address book or contact list. Common features of digital calendars are that users can:

- Enter their own events
- Change the visibility (whether events, groups of events or entire calendars are private, shared with selected users/user groups, or are public)
- Subscribe to other calendars
- Set up meetings that can be shared or where others can be invited
- Different options for setting up reminders

There are several varieties of digital calendars. Some have the ability to be connected or synchronized with other calendars across different vendors. The iCalendar 1.0 and 2.0 specifications and its associated standards have been a cornerstone of the standardization and interoperability of calendar software across different vendors. A digital calendar can be viewed as an extension of many of the features provided by time management software such as desk accessory packages and computer office automation systems.

== History ==
A calendar command appeared in Version 7 AT&T UNIX (1979). Unix calendar programs checks current directory or user directories for files with calendar entries (date separated with tab character) and prints lines that begin with today's date or tomorrow's. Calendar implementation shipped with Linux systems is from FreeBSD. There is a separate cal program that just prints a calendar for a month or a year and the date of Easter originally from Version 1 AT&T UNIX (1971). Free implementation ncal appeared in FreeBSD 2.2.6. Alternative implementation is GNU gcal.

Microsoft Windows included Calendar app from version 1.0. After Windows 3.1x Windows didn't include a calendar application until Windows Calendar in Windows Vista.

Calendar included with Apple macOS is named Calendar. It was known as iCal before OS X Mountain Lion version in 2012.

Today, digital calendars are common on many desktop environments, office suites, and in collaborative software for personal computers (desktop and laptop) as well as smartphones and tablets. Google Calendar is shipped with most Android phones and available in web.

In the 1990s and early 2000s, digital calendars was a standard feature of many personal digital assistants (PDAs) and enterprise digital assistants (EDAs). Since the early 2000s, PDAs and EDAs have been replaced by smartphones and tablets with similar functionality.

== Features ==
Calendar software can include several features. Some examples are:

=== Appointment calendar ===
An appointment calendar is a list of appointments and the attendees for the appointments. This software may include the capability of detecting scheduling conflicts, notifying the participants of the conflict, and suggesting alternate meeting times.

Some appointment software has the ability to automatically suggest shortened events by default or in cases when there are back-to-back meetings in a calendar. For example, instead of a 30 minute meeting at 13:00, a calendar software may suggest that an event is shortened to 25 minutes and either starts late (for example 5 minutes late at 13:05) or ends early (for example 13:25). Some software may have the options of combining both start late and end early. Benefits of this includes minimising the risk of needing to wait for participants who otherwise might be late for the meeting startup due to being hung up in wrapping up a previous meeting, as well as alleviating further propagation of this issue to the meetings following after. Such time buffers between meetings also gives attendees a short break between meetings.

=== Period views ===
Different period views is a feature which allow users to select how their calendar is displayed: one day, a work week, one week, one month, one year, etc.

=== Exporting calendar ===
Many digital calendars have the option of exporting the calendar to various file formats, including the iCalendar standard. In this way, the user can, for example, take the calendar with them from one computer to another, or from an old e-mail account to a new one. It also makes it possible to share a calendar with others at a given point in time.

=== Calendar publishing ===
Some calendar tools allow the user to publish select calendar information on a public link. It may also be possible for other users to subscribe. This can be useful, for example, for a sports team with announcing matches.

=== Timeblocking ===
Timeblocking is a technique where users can organize their days into segments where they set aside specified periods of time for various tasks. With digital calendars, it is possible to do this interactively and with the option of sharing your availability and reserved time with others.

=== Availability and capacity checking ===
Availability and capacity checking is an advanced function which can check the availability of all other employee and resource calendars in a group, and which may be useful assigning work decide on projects as part of resource planning.

=== Availability sharing ===
Availability sharing enables users to share when they are available. It is often possible to choose how much detail should be visible to others (for example, whether one is only "busy", the title of the event, or title and details). This can facilitate meeting scheduling amongst several individuals.

=== Collaborative scheduling ===
Collaborative scheduling means that the software suggests meeting times when all participants are free. In some cases, it is also possible for the invitees to suggest times that suit them best, so that the organizer can choose a meeting time that works well for all the participants.

In order for the software to be able to propose meeting times for participants across different organisations, the invitees' calendars must be set up to share outside their organisation when they are free.

=== Group calendar ===
A group calendar is a calendar which displays events for groups in addition to individual calendars. These can often be switched on and off, and can be used as a tool to coordinate time available for meetings.

=== Several calendars ===
A user can have multiple calendars that can be toggled on and off. This function makes it possible to categorize different events into separate calendars (such as work calendar, sports calendar, children school calendar).

=== Reminders ===
Calendars themselves can basically be seen as a passive reminder that the user has to check themselves, and can be seen as a form of reminder software. It is often also possible to set up active reminders. Various reminder techniques can be used, such as pop-up notifications, dialog boxes or auditory alarms 15 minutes or 1 hour before an event.

Events for which reminders are wanted may include birthdays, holidays, anniversaries, or various one-off events. Calendars are often supplied with a number of pre-installed events (such as national holidays) and allow the user to create their own events. Context-aware reminder systems can set reminders based on the user's current location.

== International and regional settings ==
The first day of the week in various countries according to the Common Locale Data Repository project: Monday Friday Saturday Sunday

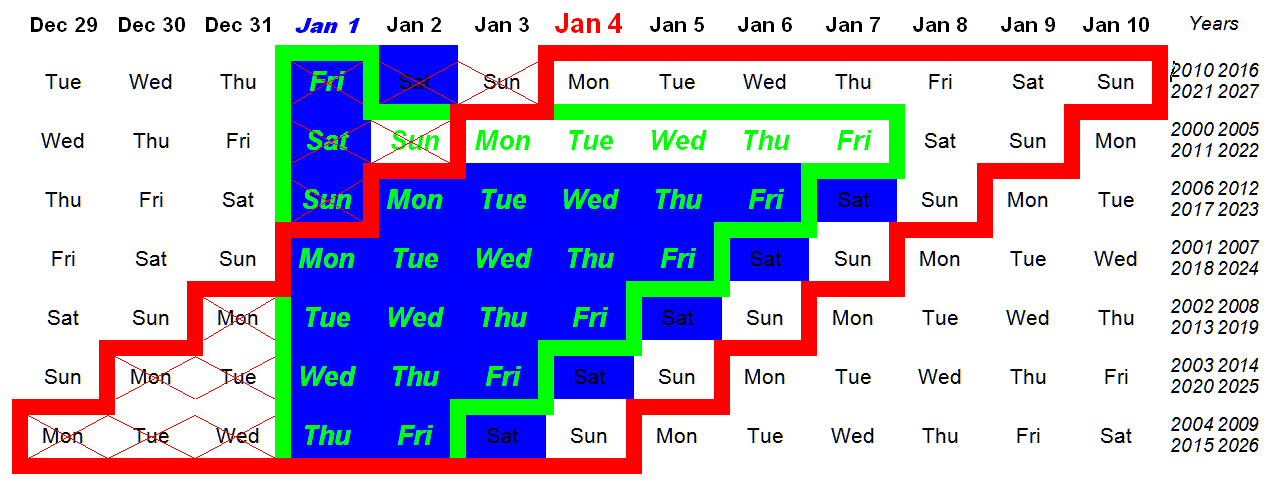
Table showing different methods for week numbering: Red frame: ISO 8601 (international week numbers) Blue background: USA and Canada Green frame and text: Middle East — Each table line represents the period around the New Year when 1 January falls on a specific weekday, and hence the start of the weekday counting.

Use of 24-hour or 12-hour clock in different countries 24-hour written Both written by different groups 12-hour written

Calendars can be set up with international or regional settings. Which settings become active may depend on settings in the computer/smartphone, settings in the browser, settings in the user profile on the calendar application, settings in the profile of the user principal name, or (typically on a work accounts) that certain settings are controlled by the organisation. These settings can in many cases be overridden manually. Sometimes the settings are tied to the language selected.

Some examples of international or regional settings might be:

- Selecting a date format, such as the international ISO 8601 (YYYY-MM-DD) or other formats such as the American (MM/DD/YYYY) or European (DD.MM.YYYY)
- Selecting a week count method and week format, such as the international ISO weeks (Monday is the first day of the week, week 1 starts in the first four-day week of the year). In addition to the international standard, at least five other systems are in use. One example is the American format (Sunday is the first day of the week, week 1 starts on the first day of the year). It is also possible to start the counting on the first full week of the year (DOT calendar and the U.S. broadcast calendar), or traditional western counting (before ISO), or a separate variant for the Middle East.
- Selecting a clock format, such as the 24-hour clock (00:00–23:59, most common internationally) or the 12-hour clock (12:00 a.m.–11:59 p.m., most common in the US and parts of Africa).
- Select a time zone, such as Coordinated Universal Time (UTC), or one of the other time zones such as for example the Central European Time (CET) used in most of Europe.
- Additionally, users may have to select units for other functionalities, such as a temperature scale and wind speed for weather forecasts, and a distance measurement for walking (and driving) distances. With metric units the corresponding units will be Celsius, meters per second (or kilometers per hour), and meters/kilometers. In the U.S., respectively, the units would be Fahrenheit, miles per hour, and statute miles/yards/feet.

== Locally or in the cloud ==
It is a common functionality to have a calendar on computers and smartphones, often via locally installed email programs or webmail that can be accessed with a standard browser.

Some examples of locally installed applications for individual use are the Lightning extension for Mozilla Thunderbird, Microsoft Outlook without Exchange Server, or Windows Calendar.

Examples of calendars which allow the sharing of information between users are Windows Live Calendar, Google Calendar, or Microsoft Outlook with Exchange Server.

=== Web-based interface ===
Web-based interfaces allow users to access their calendars from any computer, tablet or mobile phone with a web browser. This can be implemented for most calendars which can be accessed over the internet.

== Online calendar ==
An online calendar is a web application that allow one or more users to edit, and optionally share with other users, online access to a digital calendar.

Features may include:

- Drag and drop functions for creating events
- Support for recurring daily, weekly, monthly and yearly events
- Viewing by day, week or month
- Multiple calendar support
- Multiple language support
- Ability to work with different browsers, such as Firefox, Google Chrome, Safari and Internet Explorer
- Email notification
- Mobile version

Online calendars that are free to use include Google Calendar, Yahoo Calendar, Windows Calendar and Dayhaps Calendar.

Online calendars that provide an email reminder service: Google Calendar, Outlook Calendar, DayViewer and Calendar.online .

== See also ==
- Cortana Reminders
- Notification system
- Personal information manager
- Personal organizer
- Project management software
- Reminder software and notification system
- Reminders (Apple)
- Task management software
- Time-tracking software
