= Windows DNA =

Windows DNA, short for Windows Distributed interNet Applications Architecture, was a marketing name for a collection of Microsoft technologies that enabled the Windows platform and the Internet to work together. Some of the principal technologies that DNA comprised were ActiveX, Dynamic HTML (DHTML) and COM. Windows DNA was superseded by the Microsoft .NET Framework. The goal of Windows DNA was to extend Windows-centric Application development to include Internet capabilities. In additional internet capabilities, Windows DNA provided a reference architecture for a "three-tier" application, separating presentation, business, and data layers. Microsoft positioned Windows DNA to allow developers to build applications for the corporate market.
