= Windows Address Book =

Address book application in Windows XP and before

- Windows Address Book in Windows XP
- Developer: Microsoft
- Operating system: Microsoft Windows
- Predecessor: Cardfile
- Successor: Windows Contacts

Windows Address Book was a component of Microsoft Windows that lets users keep a single list of contacts that can be shared by multiple programs. It is most commonly used by Outlook Express. It was introduced with Internet Explorer 3 in 1996 and improved in subsequent versions. The Windows Address Book API can query LDAP servers or read/write data to a local .wab file. In Windows Vista, Windows Address Book was replaced with Windows Contacts.

== Overview ==
The Windows Address Book was an application that has a local database and user interface for finding and editing information about people, making it possible to query network directory servers using Lightweight Directory Access Protocol. Other applications can also use the WAB. Microsoft Office Outlook uses its own PST store for email messages. However, it can import contacts from the.WAB format. Microsoft Exchange / Windows Messaging uses.PAB file for Personal Address Book.

== Features ==
- Can store comprehensive contact information in tabs including personal and business information.
- Integrates with Outlook Express.
- Programmable API to work with other applications. Applications can also extend functionality such as adding more tabs and fields to store additional custom information or customizing the toolbar.
- Can store contacts inside contact groups and folders.
- Can selectively send email to contacts only in plain text for additional security.
- Can export and import cards to and from vCard 2.1 and CSV formats. Can also import from LDIF and other formats.
- Search for entries in the contact database, arrange contacts by first name or last name.
- Automatically add contacts from received email.
- Prints contact lists as memo, business card or phone list styles.

== Security risk ==
In May 2000, the ILOVEYOU virus showed how the Windows Address Book could be part of an exploit to spread malicious software by accessing and sending email to a user's contacts. This approach has since been adopted by many commercial spammers.

== Outlook integration ==
One of the undocumented features of the Windows Address Book is integration with Microsoft Office Outlook. A registry value has to be set at the following registry key location:

Note: Users should back up the registry before making changes.

HKCU\Software\Microsoft\WAB\WAB4

A DWORD value named "UseOutlook" (if not present already) can be created with its value set to 1. After setting this value, Outlook Contacts are shared with the Windows Address Book. This feature works only up to Windows XP and Outlook 2003. Windows Contacts introduced with Windows Vista does not support sharing contacts with Outlook. The above method works with any version of Outlook up to Outlook 2003, despite newer versions not including it as a configurable option in the user interface.

== See also ==
- Windows Contacts
- Microsoft
- Microsoft Office Outlook
- Lightweight Directory Access Protocol
