= Windows Libraries for OS/2 =

Windows Libraries for OS/2 Development Kit
- Developer: Microsoft
- Initial release: April 2, 1987
- Written in: C, C++, and Assembly
- Operating system: OS/2
- Available in: English
- Type: Compatibility layer
- License: Unknown
- Website: None

Windows Libraries for OS/2 Development Kit (WLO) is a collection of dynamic-link libraries for OS/2 that allow Win16 applications to run on OS/2.

== See also ==
- Microsoft Windows
- Cardfile
