= Cablesoft =

Early attempt to define an interactive TV standard

Cablesoft was an early attempt to define an interactive television standard. The partners in the new company were Microsoft, Tele-Communications and Time Warner. In fact, much of the effort appeared to be on Microsoft's part, and the two cable companies were essentially launch partners.

The Cablesoft effort was first announced in May 1994 and at the time consisted primarily of the Microsoft Media Server (codenamed Tiger during development) and a custom version of the Windows NT operating system known as NTAS, which was essentially a series of fine-tuning efforts to drive ATM switches. The basic model appeared to be to use a PC-like set-top box that would communicate with PC's running NTAS at the cable company's head ends, using Tiger to cue up and deliver content. Cablesoft was succeeded by MSN TV in 1997.

== Note ==
An apparently unrelated company, CableSoft, also delivered on-demand content starting around 1995. The company was headquartered in Burlington, Massachusetts.
