= Active Setup =

Active Setup is a mechanism for executing commands once per user early during login. Active Setup is used by some Microsoft Windows operating system components like Internet Explorer to set up an initial configuration for new users logging on for the first time. Active Setup is also used in some corporations’ software distribution systems to create an initial customized user environment.

Active Setup uses both machine-specific data and user-specific data. The machine part consists of a list of components identified by a GUID each. The user part is basically a mirror of the machine data, but it does not initially exist in new user profiles. Whenever a user logs on, Active Setup checks if each machine part component GUID is present in the user part. If not, the component’s command is executed and the component's GUID is added in the user part. If it is already present, the current user profile has already been modified and no further action is taken.

Active Setup is executed by explorer.exe. For that reason it does not run in Citrix XenApp / Microsoft RDS published applications.
