= Alabama Wildlife Federation =

American nonprofit organization

- Founded: 1935
- Founder: Wiley and Isabel Hill
- Purpose: Conservation
- Location: Millbrook, Alabama, United States
- Region served: United States
- Method: Education, training, research, conservation
- Executive Director: Tim L. Gothard

The Alabama Wildlife Federation (AWF) is one of the oldest and largest nonprofit organizations in the state of Alabama.

== History ==
The Alabama Wildlife Federation (AWF) was established by sportsmen in 1935 and exists to promote the conservation of the region's wildlife and natural resources. The federation encourages responsible stewardship of Alabama's wildlife, forests, fish, soils, water, and air in order to preserve them for future generations.

The AWF's headquarters is at Lanark, 10 miles north of Montgomery, Alabama. The grounds at Lanark contain five destinations: AWF Headquarters, Historic Lanark, Lanark Pavilion, ANC and the new NaturePlex.

Lanark is the former estate of Isabel and Wiley Hill, a pair of horticulturalists who moved there as newlyweds in 1948. They spent the next fifty years enlarging their house and developing the surrounding 30-acre garden. Wiley Hill died in 1995, and Isabel continued to care for the grounds until her death in 2001. She left the houses, gardens, and surrounding land to the AWF.

== Alabama Nature Center (ANC) ==
The Alabama Nature Center (ANC) is under the Alabama Wildlife Federation.

=== NaturePlex ===
The NaturePlex is a 23,000 square foot facility which serves as the Welcome and Education Center of the Alabama Nature Center. It was opened in October 2015, and intended to fulfil the AWF Board's goal of creating a world-class outdoor education center in Alabama.
