= Consumer relationship system =

Specialized customer relationship management software

Consumer relationship systems (CRS) are specialized customer relationship management (CRM) software applications that are used to handle a company's dealings with its customers.

Current consumer relationship systems integrate the software with telephone and call recording systems as well as with corporate systems for input and reporting. Customers can provide input from the company's website directly into the CRS. These systems are popular because they can deliver the 'voice of the consumer' that contributes to product quality improvement and that ultimately increases corporate profits.

Consumer relationship systems that provide automated support as well as advanced systems may have artificial intelligence (AI) interfaces that can extract and analyse data collected, or handle basic questions and complaints.

== History ==
The first CRS was developed in the 1980s. In 1981 Michael Wilke and Robert Thornton founded Wilke/Thornton, Inc in Columbus, Ohio, to develop new CRS software.

== See also ==
- ECRM
- Business intelligence
- Clienteling
- Customer experience
- Customer intelligence
- Customer service – contains ISO standards
- Customer value maximization
- Sales force management system
- Sales process engineering
