= Notification system =

Software and hardware message delivery system

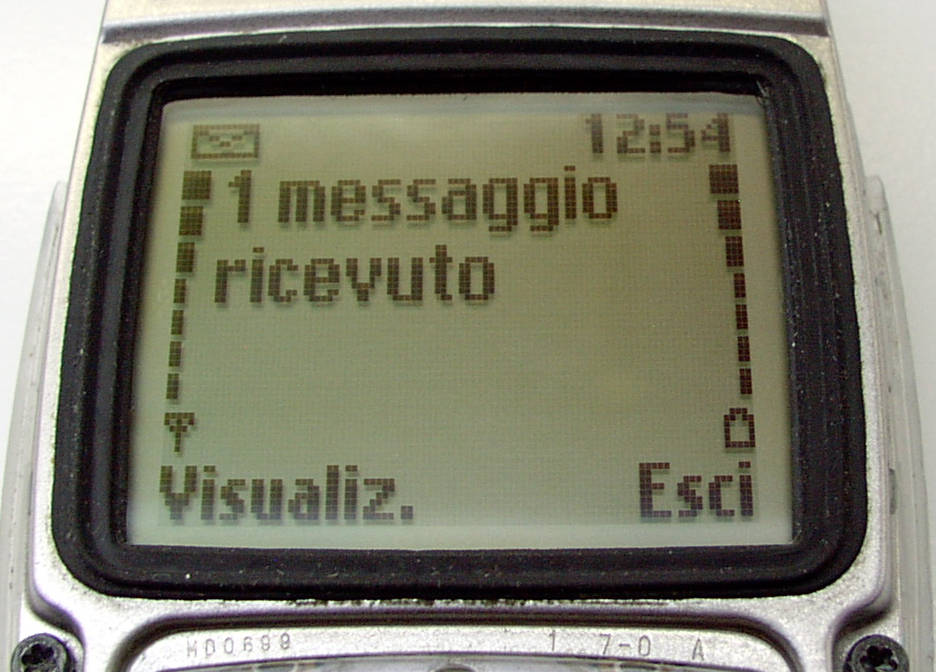
An SMS notification alert on a Nokia 3510

In information technology, a notification system is a combination of software and hardware that delivers a message to a set of recipients. It commonly displays activity related to an account. These systems are an important aspect of modern web applications.

== Implications and effects ==
The widespread adoption of notification systems was a major technological development of the 20th century. A notification is a combination of software, hardware, and psychology that provides a means of delivering a message to a group of recipients. Notifications show activity that relates to an event, account, or person.

A push notification is a message that appears on a mobile device such as a text, sports score, limited-time deal, or an e-mail announcing when a computer network will be down for scheduled maintenance. Notifications are sent from app publishers at any time in an effort to get users to open up their app or website. Notifications appear on a user's lock screen and also at the top of their phone screen when the phone is unlocked and in use. In most newer devices, notifications appearing on the lock screen can be turned off, typically via an option in the device's settings.

Push notifications can be valuable and convenient for both the app user and the developer due to the immediacy and display location of notifications. Notifications also pair with sounds to reach multiple senses of a user and reach maximum attention.

For app publishers, push notifications are a way for them to speak directly to the user without being caught by spam filters or being pushed to the side by the flood of emails within an inbox. Because of this, these push click-through rates can be higher than email. They invite users to open an app or spend time and money in a certain way by the app publisher, even when the app isn't open. This means that for developers, publishers, and businesses, notifications are the most effective way to take attention and ultimately make money.

== Psychology and ethics ==
Notifications use a concept known as variable rewards, which is a technique that slot machines use to engage gamblers. Similarly, variable reward systems keep users compulsively checking their phones due to the possibility of social approval awaiting them.

Social psychologist Jonathan Haidt at NYU Stern School of Business points to concerns of mental health directly relating to social media and the notification system. He points to the increase in depression and suicide rates among teens and young adults since the early 2000s, and Haidt states that this trend started the year social media was made available on cell phones.

Tristan Harris, former design ethicist at Google and co-founder of the Center for Humane Technology states that there is a "disinformation-for-profit business model" and companies profit by allowing "unregulated messages to reach anyone for the best price." This becomes problematic as companies have unlimited and often unwarranted access to you and your focus through the notification system. This is always used to drive larger profits, whether that means that companies use notifications to simply promote their newest product, or if they subtly try to get you back onto the app in order to take more of your time. There is overwhelming evidence that notifications are associated with decreased productivity, poorer concentration, and increased distraction at work, school, and home.

"Ping fatigue" is the mental exhaustion created by endless digital notifications (pings). The notifications arise from emails, instant messaging, package arrivals, workflow updates, and other digital tools and may disruptive to employee flow, negatively impacting productivity. The ever-present notifications lend to a sense of an infinite workday and lead to occupational burnout.

== Interactive media ==
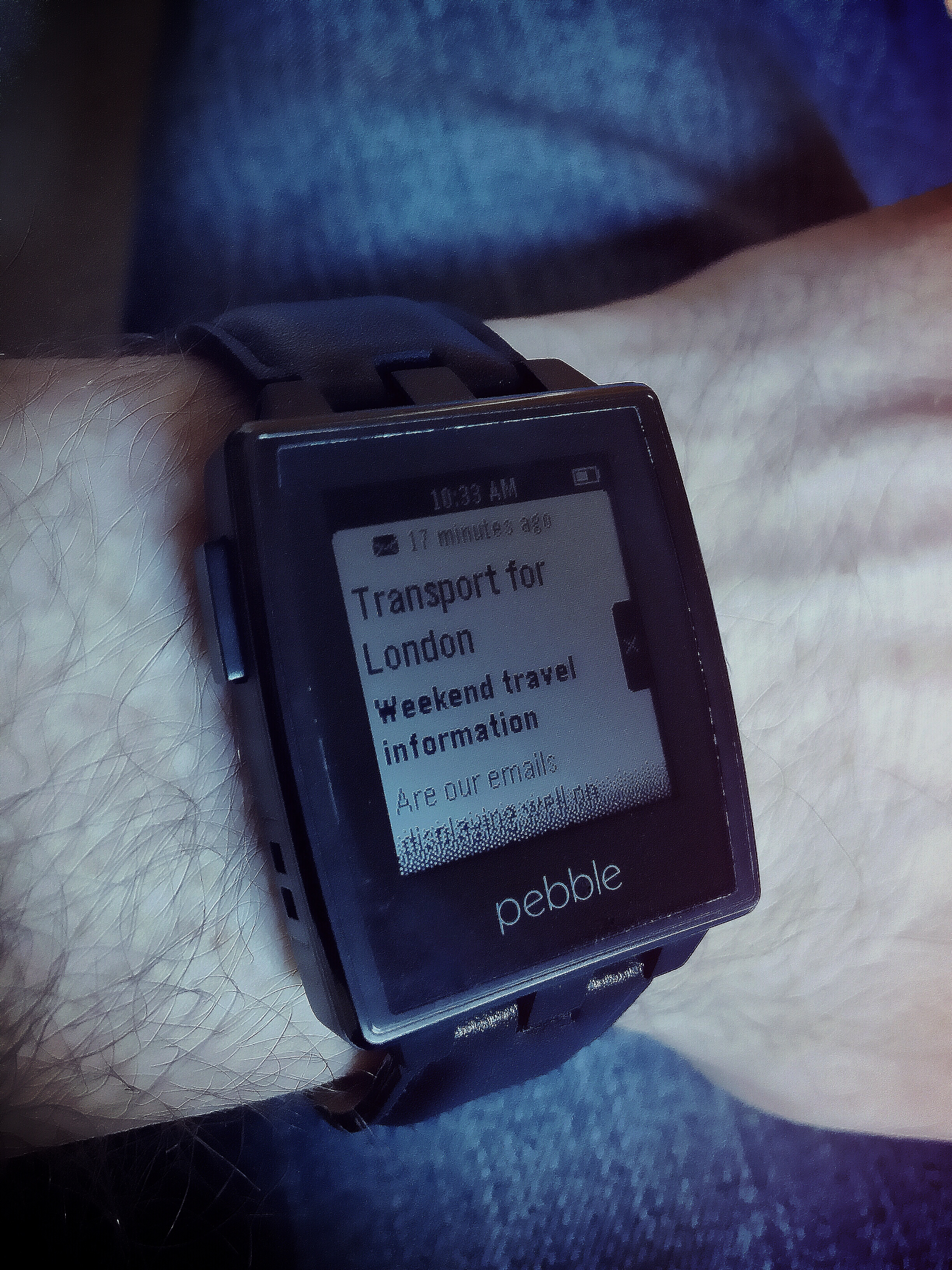
An email notification on a Pebble smartwatch

The number of ways a person can interact with technology has steadily increased. Advanced notification systems support at least one and sometimes all of the following communications media:

- Text messaging (SMS)
- Voice (telephone, cellphone, VoIP, outdoor loudspeaker, indoor PA system)
- E-mail (POP, IMAP, SMTP)
- Desktop alert (dialog, balloon, modal window, toast)
- Pager (SNPP)
- Instant messaging (IRC, ICQ, AIM, Yahoo! Messenger, MSN, XMPP, iMessage)
- RSS (RSS reader, digital signage)
- Web page (JavaScript, XML)
- Fax

== See also ==
- Doorbell
- Emergency notification system
- Emergency communication system
- Emergency broadcast system
- Emergency alert system
- Emergency telephone number
- ePrompter, an e-mail notification system
- Pop-up notification, a type of notification system
