= Broadcast calendar =

Standardized calendar used in media planning and sales

The broadcast calendar is a standardized calendar used primarily for the planning and purchase of radio and television programs and advertising. Every week in the broadcast calendar starts on a Monday and ends on a Sunday, and every month has either four or five such weeks. Broadcast calendar months thus have either 28 or 35 days.

The key link between the broadcast and Gregorian calendars is that the first week of every broadcast month always contains the Gregorian calendar first of the month. For example, if January 1 falls on a Saturday, then the broadcast calendar year would begin on the preceding Monday, December 27. Broadcast January would then have five weeks, ending on January 30, and the four weeks of broadcast February would begin on January 31. The number of weeks in a broadcast month is based on the number of Sundays that fall in that month with the period ending on the last Sunday of the month.

Days and weeks in a broadcast calendar are often referred to by number rather than name, as in Week 47, Day 3. Since each week starts on a Monday, day three is always a Wednesday, while week 47 is always the 47th week of the broadcast calendar year. The Gregorian equivalent in a given year can be looked up on any number of published calendars that are freely available for download on the Web.

Broadcast calendar years can have either 52 or 53 weeks. A broadcast calendar will have 53 weeks in a leap year where January 1 falls on a Saturday or Sunday, or in a common year where January 1 falls on a Sunday. In the 21st century, 53-week broadcast calendar years are 2006, 2012, 2017, 2023, 2028, 2034, 2040, 2045, 2051, 2056, 2062, 2068, 2073, 2079, 2084, 2090, and 2096.

The broadcast calendar often closely matches certain specialized financial calendars, such as the 4-4-5 calendar, but the length of a broadcast month can vary year to year. The broadcast year differs in most years from the ISO week year, although both start the week on Monday, because ISO starts with the week containing the first Thursday (and January 4) instead of the first Sunday (and January 1).

Furthermore, the start of a broadcast day is typically not at midnight, but near morning, usually at or near 5 a.m. local time, often coinciding with the station’s first local newscast of the day.
