= Address book =

Database used for storing contact details

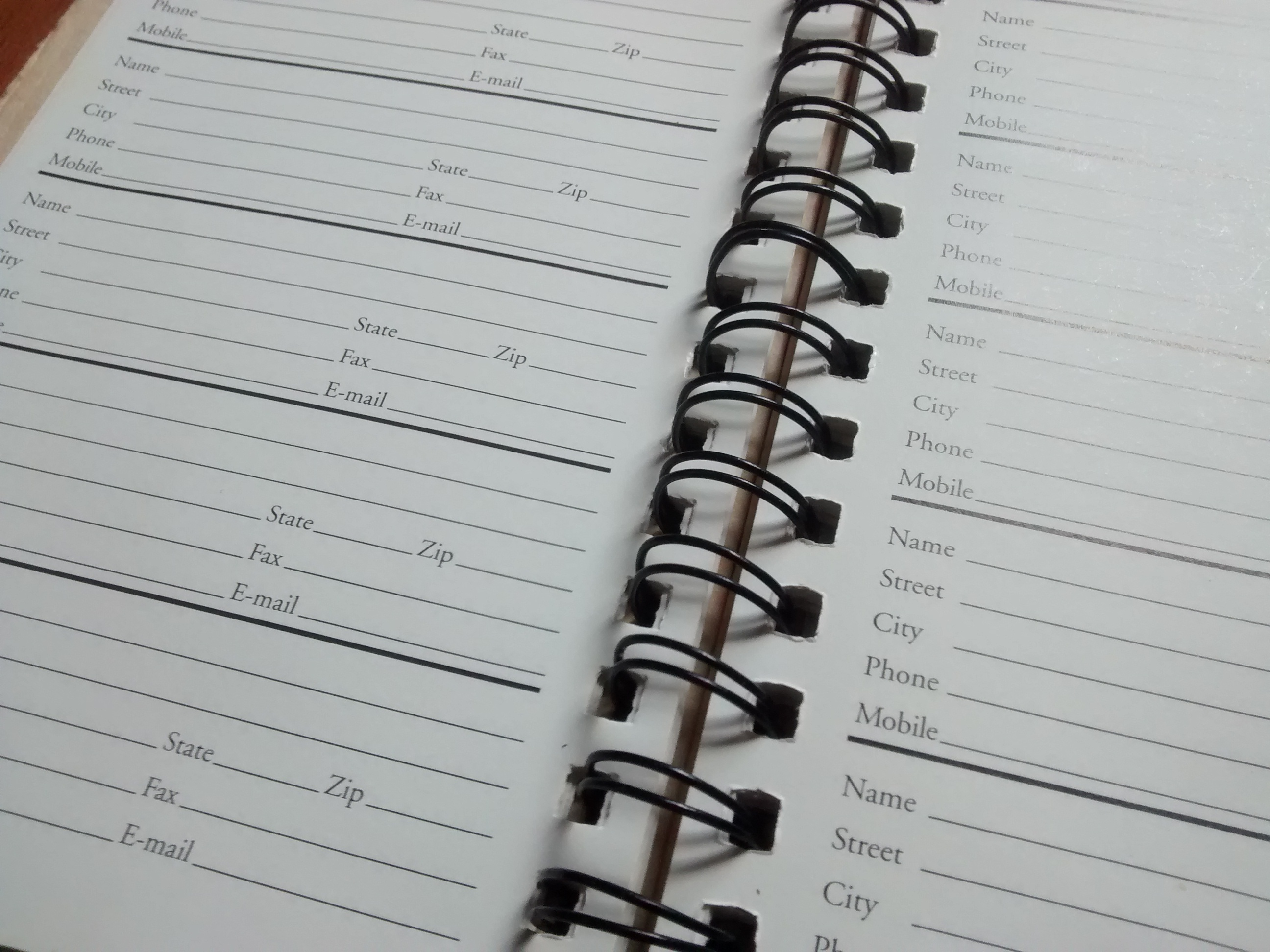
A blank page in a typical paper address book

An address book or a name and address book is a book, or a database used for storing entries, called contacts. Each contact entry usually consists of a few standard fields (for example: first name, last name, company name, address, telephone number, e-mail address, fax number, mobile phone number). Most such systems store the details in alphabetical order of people's names, although in paper-based address books entries can easily end up out of order as the owner inserts details of more individuals or as people move. Many address books use small ring binders that allow adding, removing, and shuffling of pages to make room.

== Little black book ==
The 1953 film Kiss Me, Kate features a musical scene in which Howard Keel's character laments the loss of the social life he enjoyed before marriage, naming numerous female romantic encounters while perusing a miniature black book, which has given rise to the trope of a little black book referring to a list of past or potential sexual partners.

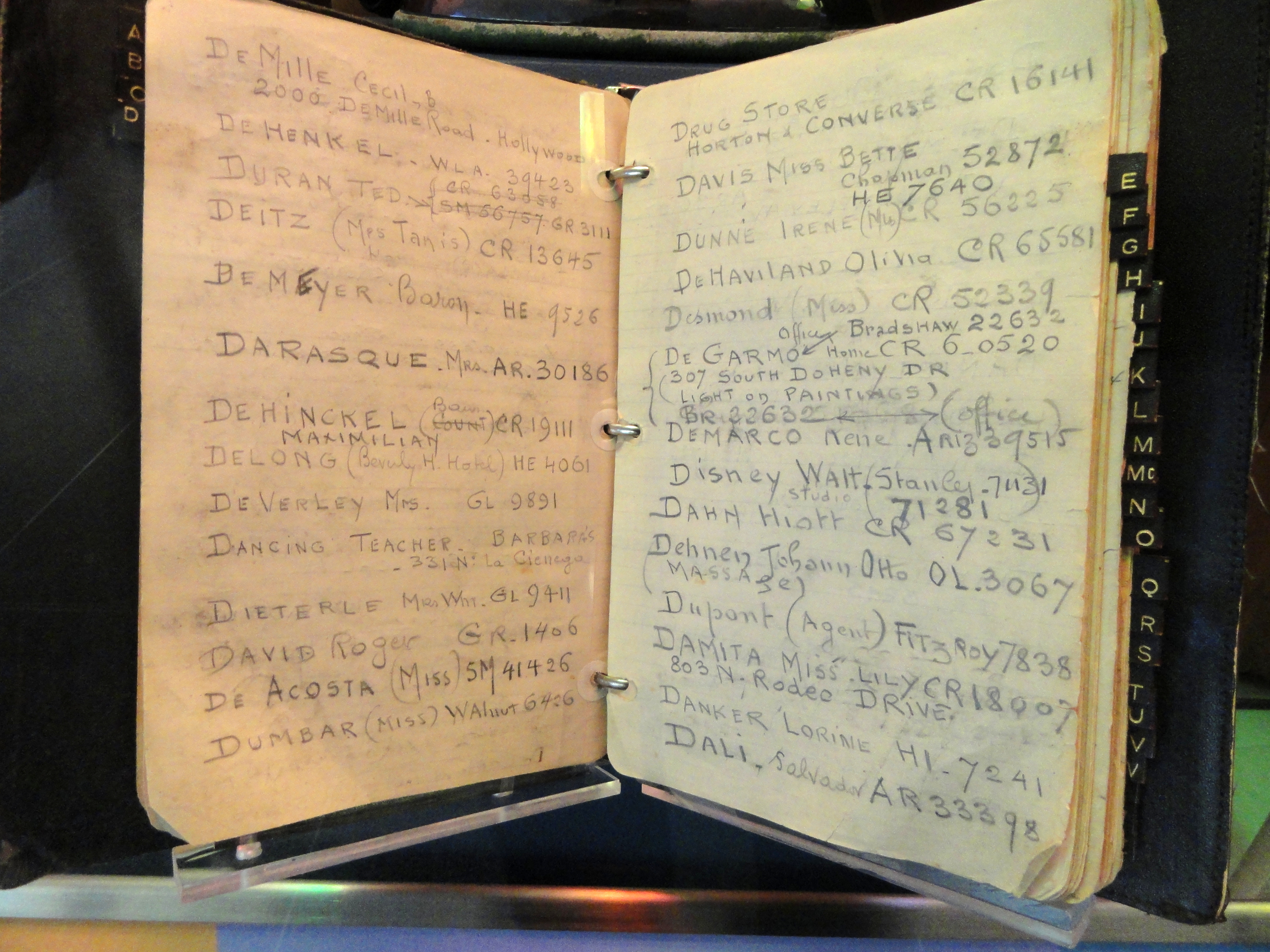
Jack L. Warner's address book on display at the National Museum of American History

== Software address book ==
A digital address book icon

Address books can also appear as software designed for this purpose, such as the "Contacts" application included with Apple Inc.'s Mac OS. Simple address books have been incorporated into email software for many years, though more advanced versions have emerged in the 1990s and beyond, and in mobile phones (a SIM card can store entries).

A personal information manager (PIM) integrates an address book, calendar, task list, and sometimes other features.

Entries can be imported and exported from the software to transfer them between programs or computers. The common file formats for these operations are:

- LDIF (*.ldif, *.ldi)
- Tab delimited (*.tab, *.txt)
- Comma-separated (*.csv)
- vCard (*.vcf)

Individual entries are frequently transferred as vCards (*.vcf), which are comparable to physical business cards. Some software applications like Lotus Notes and Open Contacts can handle a vCard file containing multiple vCard records.

== Online address book ==
An online address book typically enables users to create their own web page (or profile page), which is then indexed by search engines like Google and Bing. This in turn enables users to be found by other people via a search of their name and then contacted via their web page containing their personal information. Ability to find people registered with online address books via search engine searches usually varies according to the commonness of the name and the number of results for the name. Typically, users of such systems can synchronize their contact details with other users that they know to ensure that their contact information is kept up to date.

== Network address book ==
Many people have many different address books: their email accounts, their mobile phone, and the "friends lists" on their social networking services. A network address book allows them to organize and manage their address books through one interface and share their contacts across their different address books and social networks

== See also ==
- Calendaring software
- Contact list
- Index card
- Mobile social address book
- Personal information manager
- Rolodex
- Suvorin directories
- Telephone directory
- Windows Address Book
