= Mail (Windows) =

Conflation of two applications developed by Microsoft

- Mail running on Windows 10 with the light theme
- Developer: Microsoft
- Release: November 30, 2006; 19 years ago
- Stable release: 16005.14326.22342.0 / 9 April 2025; 17 months ago
- Operating system: Windows Vista and later
- Predecessor: Outlook Express, Windows Live Mail
- Successor: Outlook for Windows
- Type: Email client

Mail (later Microsoft Outlook) is a discontinued email client developed by Microsoft and included in Windows Vista and later versions of Windows. It was available as the successor to Outlook Express, which was either included with, or released for Internet Explorer 3.0 and later versions of Internet Explorer. It was succeeded by Outlook for Windows.

== Windows Vista ==
A screenshot of Windows Mail displaying a user's Inbox folder

Windows Mail can be traced to a pre-release version of Outlook Express 7 included in early builds of Windows Vista (then known by its codename, "Longhorn"). Outlook Express 7 introduced various changes to the user interface and relied on WinFS for the management and storage of contacts, email, and other data. It supported Post Office Protocol (POP) and Internet Message Access Protocol (IMAP) email protocols, but no longer supported Microsoft's proprietary mail-over-HTTP scheme, an omission inherited by Windows Mail. IPv6 is fully supported.

Windows Mail was formally announced on September 16, 2005 at Channel 9 and positioned as the successor to Outlook Express. Windows Mail is a fundamentally new application with significant feature additions (many which were previously exclusive to Internet Explorer or Microsoft Outlook) and fundamental revisions to the storage architecture and security mechanisms. Identities in Outlook Express are replaced with Windows user profiles. The storage of items is managed by a Extensible Storage Engine database — the same engine used by Active Directory and Microsoft Exchange — with messages and newsgroups stored as separate eml and nws files instead of in a single dbx file; the database is transactional and periodically creates backups of items to protect against data loss, which eliminates the single point of failure design of Outlook Express. Account configuration information is also no longer stored in the Windows Registry or in a single dbx file—instead, Windows Mail relies on XML files stored within a user profile alongside email, making it possible to simply copy an entire email store to another machine. Windows Mail supports the Windows Search platform, allowing communications to be searched directly from within the Windows Shell.

Windows Mail is also intended to be a significantly more secure offering than Outlook Express by including Bayesian spam filtering, email attachment blocking, junk email filtering functionality of Microsoft Exchange, the Phishing Filter of Internet Explorer 7, and top-level domain blocking. All of these features, excluding Internet Explorer Phishing Filter integration, were included in Microsoft Office Outlook 2003 as part of Microsoft Office 2003.

Windows Mail has a documented application programming interface (API) based on Component Object Model (COM). Except for Simple MAPI messaging functionality, the API of Outlook Express was undocumented.

== Windows 7 ==
Windows Mail is excluded from Windows 7 in favor of Windows Live Mail, part of Windows Essentials.

== Windows 8.x ==
Mail in Windows 8 and 8.1 is a completely new application based on the Windows Runtime, designed in accordance with Microsoft's Metro design language philosophy, as a Windows Store app that runs in either full-screen or split-screen viewing modes; many of its features are hidden in the charms or in the app bar (an initially hidden toolbar) at the bottom of the screen that is revealed by right-clicking or by swiping upward. Mail is updated independently from the operating system and is bundled with Calendar and People—it cannot be installed or uninstalled individually.

Preset server configurations for Outlook.com, Gmail, AOL Mail, and Yahoo! Mail are available; Exchange Server or IMAP accounts can be configured, but Mail does not directly support POP3.

== Windows 10 and 11 ==
Mail in Windows 10 and 11 has preset server configurations for Outlook.com, Office 365, Gmail, iCloud, and Yahoo! Mail. AOL Mail, as well as other Exchange Server and IMAP accounts, can still be added, and POP3 support has returned. Newsgroup/Usenet support remains absent. Mail and Calendar are still Universal Windows apps and are in the same app container, but their third sibling, People, is moved out of this container and is a standalone app by itself.

Users can set Mail to use the system theme or choose a custom accent color, background image, and light/dark preference. It has multi-window support and can open email messages in a new window. Emails are listed in Mail's jumplist. Mail uses a settings panel, email sorting tools in the second pane, and a toolbar in the viewing pane. Like the Vista version of Mail, this version's important controls are readily visible. Accounts can be grouped and relabeled, and custom folders can be created, edited, or deleted within the app. It is possible to use Outlook.com aliases and @mentions with Mail.

Like Microsoft Outlook, Mail allows users to set up Quick Actions, such as Delete, Set Flag, and Archive, to respond to messages from system notifications and swipe gestures.

In December 2019, Mail added non-removable advertisements for the Microsoft Outlook mobile app.

In 2023, Microsoft announced that beginning in 2024, new Windows 11 devices would be shipped with the new Outlook for Windows, and that the default Windows Mail and Calendar applications would be replaced by the end of 2024.

Support for Windows Mail ended on December 31, 2024.

== Heritage ==
As with Microsoft Outlook and Outlook Express, Mail uses Ctrl+E to invoke the search. All other Microsoft products use Ctrl+F.

== See also ==
- Comparison of email clients
- Comparison of Usenet newsreaders
- List of Microsoft Windows components
