= Microsoft Outlook =

Email and calendaring software

- Microsoft Outlook app icon

- An email inbox in Outlook (New UI, 365/Office 2024), running on Windows 11
- Developer: Microsoft Corporation
- Release: January 16, 1997; 29 years ago

Stable release(s)
- Office 2024 (LTSC): 2408 (Build 17932.21140) / 10 November 2026; 7 days ago
- Office 2021 (LTSC): 2108 (Build 14334.21048) / 10 November 2026; 7 days ago
- Office 2019 (LTSC): 1808 (Build 10417.20236) / 10 November 2026; 7 days ago
- Office 2024 (Retail): 2610 (Build 20527.20196) / 10 November 2026; 7 days ago
- Office 2021 (Retail): 2610 (Build 20527.20196) / 10 November 2026; 7 days ago
- Office 2019 (Retail): 2509 (Build 19231.20194) / 14 October 2025; 13 months ago
- Operating system: Windows, macOS
- Type: Personal information manager
- License: Trialware
- Website: outlook.office.com

Microsoft Outlook is a personal information manager software system from Microsoft, available as a part of the Microsoft 365 software suite. Primarily popular as an email client for businesses, Outlook also includes functions such as calendaring, task managing, contact managing, note-taking, journal logging, web browsing, and RSS news aggregation.

Individuals can use Outlook as a stand-alone application; organizations can deploy it as multi-user software (through Microsoft Exchange Server or SharePoint) for shared functions such as mailboxes, calendars, folders, data aggregation (i.e., SharePoint lists), and as appointment scheduling apps.

== Versions ==
Outlook replaced Microsoft's previous scheduling and email clients, Schedule+ and Exchange Client.

Outlook 98 and Outlook 2000 offer two configurations:

- Internet Mail Only (aka IMO mode): A lighter application mode with specific emphasis on POP3 and IMAP accounts, including a lightweight fax application.
- Corporate Work group (aka CW mode): A full MAPI client with specific emphasis on Microsoft Exchange accounts.

Perpetual versions of Microsoft Outlook include:

Name	Version number (Note: The version numbers follows the Office numbers.)	Release date	Notes
Outlook 97	8.0	January 16, 1997	Included in Office 97 and bundled with Exchange Server 5.0 and 5.5. This was a renamed and slightly upgraded version of the Microsoft Exchange client.
Outlook 98	8.5	June 21, 1998	Freely distributed with books and magazines to cope with the newest Internet standards such as HTML email. Outlook 98 setup was based on Active Setup which also installed Internet Explorer 4.
Outlook 2000	9.0	June 27, 1999	Included in Office 2000 and bundled with Exchange 2000 Server
Outlook 2002	10	May 31, 2001	Included in Office XP
Outlook 2003	11	November 20, 2003	Included in Office 2003 (incl. Standard Edition for Students and Teachers) and bundled with Exchange Server 2003
Outlook 2007	12	January 27, 2007	Included in Office 2007, except Office Home and Student edition
Outlook 2010	14	July 15, 2010	Included in Office 2010 Home and Business, Standard, Professional and Professional Plus
Outlook 2011 for Mac	14	October 26, 2010	Included in Office for Mac 2011 Home and Business
Outlook 2013	15	January 29, 2013	Included in Office 2013, except Home & Student edition
Outlook for Mac	15.3	October 31, 2014	Included in Office 365, except some commercial editions
Outlook 2016	16	September 22, 2015	Included in Office 2016 and Office 365
Outlook 2016 for Mac	15.12	September 25, 2015	Included in Office 2016 and Office 365
Outlook 2019	16	September 24, 2018	Included in Office 2019 and Office 365
Outlook 2019 for Mac	16.17	September 24, 2018	Included in Office 2019 and Office 365
Outlook for Phones & Tablets	1.3	2015	Included in Office 365, except some commercial editions; Includes iOS and Android support

=== Microsoft Outlook ===
Microsoft Outlook is an email and personal information manager software primarily used in professional settings. As part of the Microsoft Office suite, it offers email management, contact storage, calendar scheduling, and task tracking. Outlook can function independently or as part of a larger Microsoft ecosystem, including integration with SharePoint for file sharing. While it stores email data locally for offline access, newer versions restrict link opening to Microsoft's own browsers.

Privacy is severely degraded in the latest versions, as the new Outlook sends passwords, mails and other data to Microsoft.

The main Outlook 2007 interface with its menus and toolbars

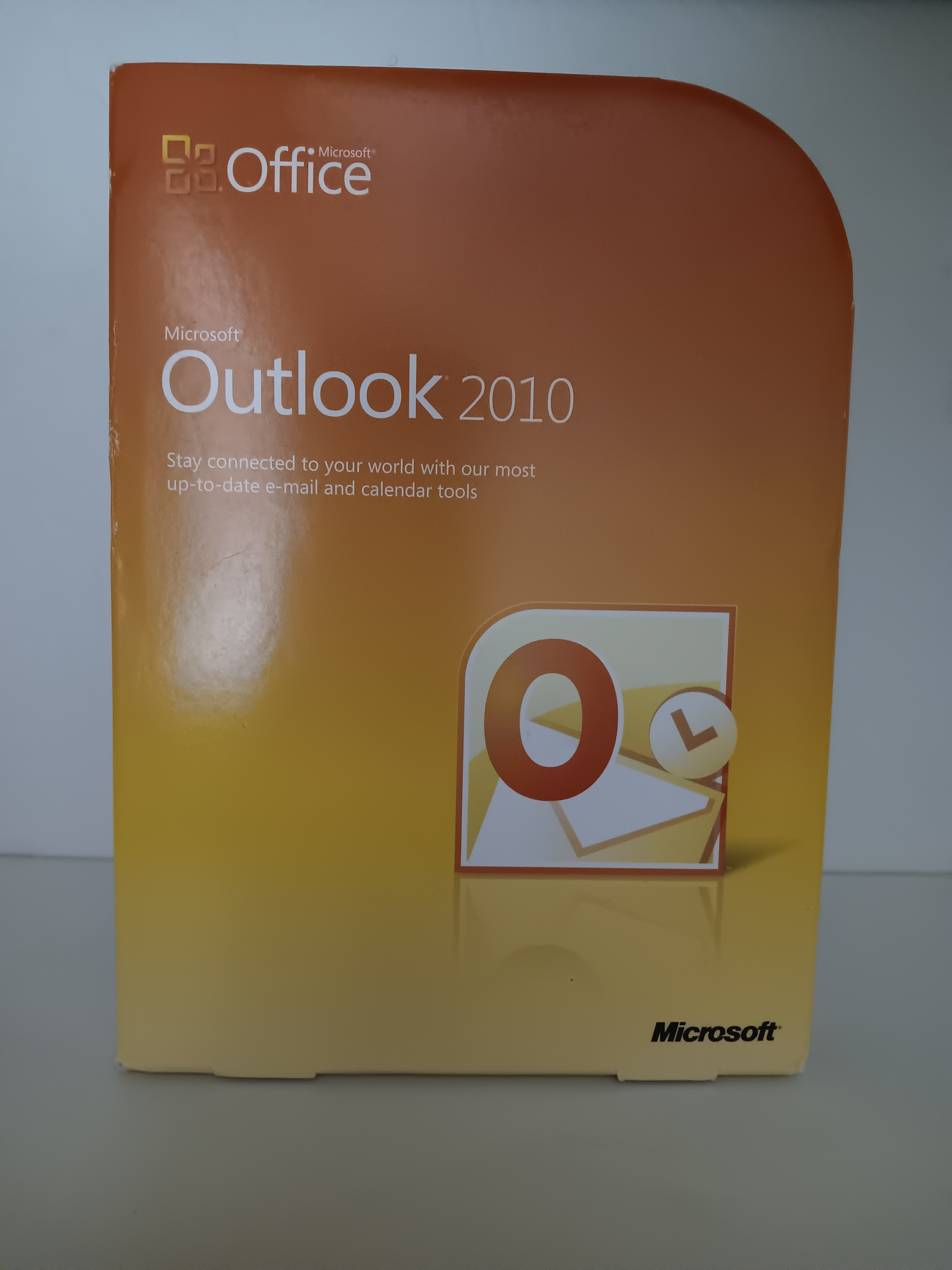
Outlook 2010 in a retail box

=== Macintosh ===
Outlook for Mac with the new UI applied

Before 2011, Microsoft did not offer Outlook for Mac. Instead, it provided Microsoft Entourage (and earlier, Outlook Express for Mac). Microsoft Entourage was Microsoft's personal information manager for Mac, including email, calendar, contacts, and tasks, and Outlook for Mac was included with Office for Mac 2011 Home & Business.

Microsoft Entourage was Microsoft's email app for Mac. It was similar to Outlook but initially lacked full native support for Microsoft Exchange. Later versions, especially Entourage 2008 Web Services Edition, added much better Exchange support, but Entourage remained a separate application from Outlook.

Microsoft Outlook for Mac 2011

Entourage was replaced by Outlook for Mac 2011, which offered improved compatibility with Microsoft Exchange and a user interface more consistent with Outlook for Windows, although feature parity was still incomplete. It is the first native version of Outlook for Mac OS X.

Outlook 2011 initially supported Mac OS X's Sync Services only for contacts, not events, tasks or notes. It also does not have a Project Manager equivalent to that in Entourage. With Service Pack 1 (v 14.1.0), published on April 12, 2011, Outlook can now sync calendar, notes and tasks with Exchange 2007 and Exchange 2010.

On October 31, 2014, Microsoft released Outlook for Mac (v15.3 build 141024) with Office 365 (a software as a service licensing program that makes Office programs available as soon as they are developed). The "New Outlook for Mac" client, included with version 16.42 and above, became available for "Early Insider" testers in the fall of 2019, with a public "Insider" debut in October 2020. It requires macOS 10.14 or greater and introduces a redesigned interface with significantly changed internals, including native search within the client that no longer depends on macOS Spotlight. Some Outlook features are still missing from the New Outlook client as it continues in development.

To date, the Macintosh client has never had the capability of syncing Contact Groups/Personal Distribution Lists from Exchange, Microsoft 365 or Outlook.com accounts, something that the Windows and web clients have always supported. A UserVoice post created in December 2019 suggesting that the missing functionality be added has shown a "Planned" tag since October 2020.

In March 2023, Microsoft announced that Outlook for Mac will be available for free. This means that users no longer need a Microsoft 365 subscription or an Office licence to use the program.

=== Phones and tablets ===
First released in April 2014 by the venture capital-backed startup Acompli, the company was acquired by Microsoft in December 2014. On January 29, 2015, Acompli was re-branded as Outlook Mobile—sharing its name with the Microsoft Outlook desktop personal information manager and Outlook.com email service. In January 2015, Microsoft released Outlook for phones and for tablets (v1.3 build) with Office 365. This was the first Outlook for these platforms with email, calendar, and contacts.

On February 4, 2015, Microsoft acquired Sunrise Calendar; on September 13, 2016, Sunrise ceased to operate, and an update was released to Outlook Mobile that contained enhancements to its calendar functions.

Similar to its desktop counterpart, Outlook mobile offers an aggregation of attachments and files stored on cloud storage platforms; a "focused inbox" highlights messages from frequent contacts, and calendar events, files, and locations can be embedded in messages without switching apps. The app supports a number of email platforms and services, including Outlook.com, Microsoft Exchange and Google Workspace (formerly G Suite) among others.

Outlook mobile is designed to consolidate functionality that would normally be found in separate apps on mobile devices, similar to personal information managers on personal computers. It is designed around four "hubs" for different tasks: "Mail", "Calendar," "Files" and "People". The "People" hub lists frequently and recently used contacts and aggregates recent communications with them, and the "Files" hub aggregates recent attachments from messages, and can also integrate with other online storage services such as Dropbox, Google Drive, and OneDrive. To facilitate indexing of content for search and other features, emails and other information are stored on external servers.

Outlook mobile supports a large number of different e-mail services and platforms, including Exchange, iCloud, Gmail, Google Workspace (formerly G Suite), Outlook.com, and Yahoo! Mail. The app supports multiple email accounts at once.

Emails are divided into two inboxes: the "Focused" inbox displays messages of high importance, and those from frequent contacts. All other messages are displayed within an "Other" section. Files, locations, and calendar events can be embedded into email messages. Swiping gestures can be used for deleting messages.

Like the desktop Outlook, Outlook mobile allows users to see appointment details, respond to Exchange meeting invites, and schedule meetings. It also incorporates the three-day view and "Interesting Calendars" features from Sunrise.

Microsoft announced in 2026 that the previous Outlook Lite app would be discontinued, with Outlook Mobile serving as its successor.

Files in the Files tab are not stored offline; they require Internet access to view.

==== Security ====
Outlook mobile temporarily stores and indexes user data (including email, attachments, calendar information, and contacts), along with login credentials, in a "secure" form on Microsoft Azure servers located in the United States. On Exchange accounts, these servers identify as a single Exchange ActiveSync user in order to fetch e-mail. Additionally, the app does not support mobile device management, nor allows administrators to control how third-party cloud storage services are used with the app to interact with their users. Concerns surrounding these security issues have prompted some firms, including the European Parliament, to block the app on their Exchange servers. Microsoft maintains a separate, pre-existing Outlook Web Access app for Android and iOS.

==== Outlook Groups ====
Outlook Groups was a mobile application for Windows Phone, Windows 10 Mobile, Android and iOS that could be used with an Office 365 domain Microsoft Account, e.g. a work or school account. It is designed to take existing email threads and turn them into a group-style conversation. The app lets users create groups, mention their contacts, share Office documents via OneDrive and work on them together, and participate in an email conversation. The app also allows the finding and joining of other Outlook Groups. It was tested internally at Microsoft and launched September 18, 2015, for Windows Phone 8.1 and Windows 10 Mobile users.

After its initial launch on Microsoft's own platforms the application was released for Android and iOS on September 23, 2015.

Outlook Groups was updated on September 30, 2015 to introduce a deep linking feature as well as fix a bug that blocked the "send" button from working. In March 2016 Microsoft added the ability to attach multiple images and the most recently used document to group messages, as well as the option to delete conversations within the application program.

Outlook Groups was retired by Microsoft on May 1, 2018. The functionality was replaced by adding the "Groups node" to the folder list within the Outlook mobile app.

== Internet standards compliance ==
=== HTML rendering ===
Outlook 2007 was the first Outlook to switch from the Internet Explorer rendering engine to Microsoft Word 2007's. This meant that HTML and Cascading Style Sheets (CSS) items not handled by Word were no longer supported. On the other hand, HTML messages composed in Word look as they appeared to the author. This affects publishing newsletters and reports, because they frequently use intricate HTML and CSS to form their layout. For example, forms can no longer be embedded in an Outlook email.

=== Support of CSS properties and HTML attributes ===
Outlook for Windows has very limited CSS support compared to various other e-mail clients. Neither CSS1 (1996) nor CSS2 (1998) specifications are fully implemented and many CSS properties can only to be used with certain HTML elements for the desired effect. Some HTML attributes help achieve proper rendering of e-mails in Outlook, but most of these attributes are already deprecated in the HTML 4.0 specifications (1997). In order to achieve the best compatibility with Outlook, most HTML e-mails are created using multiple boxed tables, as the table element and its sub-elements support the width and height property in Outlook. No improvements have been made towards a more standards-compliant email client since the release of Outlook 2007.

=== Transport Neutral Encapsulation Format ===
Outlook and Exchange Server internally handle messages, appointments, and items as objects in a data model which is derived from the old proprietary Microsoft Mail system, the Rich Text Format from Microsoft Word and the complex OLE general data model. When these programs interface with other protocols such as the various Internet and X.400 protocols, they try to map this internal model onto those protocols in a way that can be reversed if the ultimate recipient is also running Outlook or Exchange.

This focus on the possibility that emails and other items will ultimately be converted back to Microsoft Mail format is so extreme that if Outlook/Exchange cannot figure out a way to encode the complete data in the standard format, it simply encodes the entire message/item in a proprietary binary format called Transport Neutral Encapsulation Format (TNEF) and sends this as an attached file (usually named "winmail.dat") to an otherwise incomplete rendering of the mail/item. If the recipient is Outlook/Exchange it can simply discard the incomplete outer message and use the encapsulated data directly, but if the recipient is any other program, the message received will be incomplete because the data in the TNEF attachment will be of little use without the Microsoft software for which it was created. As a workaround, numerous tools for partially decoding TNEF files exist.

=== Calendar compatibility ===
Outlook does not fully support data and syncing specifications for calendaring and contacts, such as iCalendar, CalDAV, SyncML, and vCard 3.0. Outlook 2007 claims to be fully iCalendar compliant; however, it does not support all core objects, such as VTODO or VJOURNAL. Also, Outlook supports vCard 2.1 and does not support multiple contacts in the vCard format as a single file. Outlook has also been criticized for having proprietary "Outlook extensions" to these Internet standards.

=== .msg format ===
Outlook (both the web version and recent non-web versions) promotes the usage of a proprietary .msg format to save individual emails, instead of the standard .eml format. Messages use .msg by default when saved to disk or forwarded as attachments. Compatibility with past or future Outlook versions is not documented nor guaranteed; the format saw over 10 versions released since version 1 in 2008.

The standard .eml format replicates the format of emails as used for transmission and is therefore compatible with any email client which uses the normal protocols. Standard-compliant email clients, like Mozilla Thunderbird, use additional headers to store software-specific information related e.g. to the local storage of the email, while keeping the file plain-text, so that it can be read in any text editor and searched or indexed like any document by any other software.

== Security concerns ==
As part of its Trustworthy Computing initiative, Microsoft took corrective steps to fix Outlook's reputation for a lack of security in Office Outlook 2003. Among the most publicized security features are that Office Outlook 2003 does not automatically load images in HTML emails or permit opening executable attachments by default, and includes a built-in Junk Mail filter. Service Pack 2 has augmented these features and adds an anti-phishing filter.

== Outlook add-ins ==
Outlook add-ins are small additional programs for the Microsoft Outlook application, mainly purposed to add new functional capabilities into Outlook and automate various routine operations. The term also refers to programs where the main function is to work on Outlook files, such as synchronization or backup utilities. Outlook add-ins may be developed in Microsoft Visual Studio or third-party tools such as Add-in Express. Outlook add-ins are not supported in Outlook Web App.

From Outlook 97 on, Exchange Client Extensions are supported in Outlook. Outlook 2000 and later support specific COM components called Outlook Add-Ins. The exact supported features (such as .NET components) for later generations were extended with each release.

=== SalesforceIQ Inbox for Outlook ===
In March 2016, Salesforce announced that its relationship intelligence platform, SalesforceIQ, would be able to seamlessly integrate with Outlook. SalesforceIQ works from inside the Outlook inbox providing data from CRM, email, and customer social profiles. It also provides recommendations within the inbox on various aspects like appointment scheduling, contacts, responses, etc.

=== Hotmail Connector ===
Hotmail Connector setup screen

Microsoft Outlook Hotmail Connector (formerly Microsoft Office Outlook Connector), is a discontinued and defunct free add-in for Microsoft Outlook 2003, 2007 and 2010, intended to integrate Outlook.com (formerly Hotmail) into Microsoft Outlook. It uses DeltaSync, a proprietary Microsoft communications protocol that was formerly used by Hotmail.

In version 12, access to tasks and notes and online synchronization with MSN Calendar is only available to MSN subscribers of paid premium accounts. Version 12.1, released in December 2008 as an optional upgrade, uses Windows Live Calendar instead of the former MSN Calendar. This meant that calendar features became free for all users, except for task synchronization which became unavailable. In April 2008, version 12.1 became a required upgrade to continue using the service as part of a migration from MSN Calendar to Windows Live Calendar.

Microsoft Outlook 2013 and its newer versions have intrinsic support for accessing Outlook.com and its calendar over the Exchange ActiveSync (EAS) protocol, while older versions of Microsoft Outlook can read and synchronize Outlook.com emails over the IMAP protocol.

=== Social Connector ===
Outlook Social Connector was a free add-in for Microsoft Outlook 2003 and 2007 by Microsoft that allowed integration of social networks such as Facebook, LinkedIn and Windows Live Messenger into Microsoft Outlook. It was first introduced on November 18, 2009. Starting with Microsoft Office 2010, Outlook Social Connector is an integral part of Outlook.

=== CardDAV and CalDAV Connector ===
Since Microsoft Outlook does not support CalDAV and CardDAV protocol along the way, various third-party software vendors developed Outlook add-ins to enable users synchronizing with CalDAV and CardDAV servers. Nextcloud recommends the Open Source Caldavsynchronizer. CalConnect listed software that enables users to synchronize their calendars with CalDAV servers/contacts with CardDAV servers, but most of them are outdated.

== Importing from other email clients ==
Traditionally, Outlook supported importing messages from Outlook Express and Lotus Notes. In addition, Microsoft Outlook supports POP3 and IMAP protocols, enabling users to import emails from servers that support these protocols. Microsoft Hotmail Connector add-in (described above) helps importing emails from Hotmail accounts. Outlook 2013 later integrated the functionality of this add-in and added the ability to import email (as well as a calendar) through Exchange ActiveSync protocol.

There are multiple methods to get the emails from Thunderbird. The first is to use a tool that can convert a Thunderbird folder to a format that can be imported from Outlook Express. This method must be processed folder by folder. The other method is to use some free tools that keep the original folder structure. If Exchange is available, an easier method is to connect the old mail client (Thunderbird) to Exchange using IMAP, and upload the original mail from the client to the Exchange account.

== New Outlook for Windows ==
In May 2022, Microsoft announced a preview release of new Outlook for Windows, available initially to Office Insiders. The new version of Outlook is a progressive web app (PWA) architecture derived from Outlook on the web and introduced a unified codebase platforms. The application was later made more widely available, as Microsoft began transitioning users from the Windows Mail and Calendar apps to the new Outlook, discontinuing those apps on December 31, 2024.

The new Outlook for Windows preview later became available to all existing Outlook for Windows users and also users of the free Mail and Calendar app, which was retired in favor of the new app on December 31, 2024.

The new Outlook has been criticized for having worse performance compared to the previous native versions as well as lack of offline support and missing a unified inbox. Privacy concerns have also been raised around the decision to synchronise non-Microsoft email accounts with the Microsoft cloud, rather than downloading emails to the local device as previous versions have done.

Conflicts between the new Outlook and the old Outlook led to the famous complaint "I have two Microsoft Outlooks and neither one of those are working" from Artemis II's Commander Reid Wiseman, an issue that was eventually resolved by Mission Control.

New Outlook is much slower than Outlook classic. The new Outlook takes 10 seconds to perform some actions that classic Outlook performed instantly.

== Reception ==
In a February 2013 review, PCMag rated Outlook 2013 4.5 out of 5, praising its redesigned interface, message previews, exchange support and quick access to calendar, contact and task information. The review criticized the standalone price and the placement of some printing options, describing the release as an improvement rather than a major overhaul.

== See also ==
- Address book
- Calendar (Apple)—iCal
- Comparison of email clients
- Comparison of feed aggregators
- Comparison of office suites
- GNOME Evolution
- Kontact
- List of personal information managers
- Personal Storage Table (.pst file)
- Windows Contacts
