= Cyberattacks against infrastructure =

Critical infrastructure, including control systems, energy grids, financial institutions, transportation networks, and water facilities, is a frequent target of cyberattacks. As these systems increasingly rely on interconnected industrial control systems (ICS) and SCADA networks, their vulnerability to remote exploitation has grown. Cyberattacks that result in adverse physical effects are classified as cyber-physical attacks.

Cyberattacks on critical infrastructure have increased significantly in recent decades. High-profile incidents across various sectors, such as the Colonial Pipeline cyberattack in energy, ransomware attacks on hospitals, and cyber espionage targeting nuclear waste management sites, highlight the growing economic disruption, safety hazards, and data security threats posed by vulnerabilities in critical infrastructure.

== Control systems ==
Historically, a report on industrial cybersecurity problems by the British Columbia Institute of Technology and the PA Consulting Group, using data from as far back as 1981, found a tenfold increase in the number of successful cyberattacks on SCADA systems infrastructure between 1981 and 2000.

Industrial control systems (ICS) are responsible for activating and monitoring industrial or mechanical processes. Many devices are integrated with computer platforms to control physical infrastructures, such as valves, gates, and electrical substations. These systems are often designed as remote telemetry devices that link to other physical devices via the internet or communication networks. Because ICS networks were traditionally isolated from corporate IT environments, they frequently lacked built-in security protocols, such as password protection or network segmentation, leaving them vulnerable to exploitation.

In an early 2000s security assessment demonstrated by cybersecurity firm manager Paul Blomgren, engineers highlighted how easily these legacy vulnerabilities could be exploited. By accessing an unsecured wireless network antenna at a remote substation from their vehicle, the team connected to the system without requiring a password. Within 20 minutes, they mapped the facility's operational equipment, bypassed the control network to access the connected business network, and extracted sensitive reports without entering the facility.

== Energy ==
Energy infrastructure, which includes electricity grids and natural gas pipelines, is a prime target for cyberattacks due to its critical role in modern society. Disabling these systems can cause significant economic disruption, public safety hazards, and infrastructure damage.

Electricity grids rely on industrial control systems to balance power generation and distribution. Cyberattacks on these systems can cause widespread blackouts or damage physical equipment. For example, in the United States, threat actors can exploit vulnerabilities in grid telemetry data to identify critical load centers and initiate targeted disruptions.

Cyberattacks on natural gas installations can similarly shut down operations or reroute gas flows. In Russia, a gas supplier known as Gazprom lost control of its central switchboard, which routes gas flow, after an inside job and Trojan horse program bypassed security. The 2021 Colonial Pipeline cyberattack caused a sudden shutdown of the pipeline that carried 45% of the gasoline, diesel, and jet fuel consumed on the East Coast of the United States.

Wind farms, both onshore and offshore, are also at risk. In February 2022, a German wind turbine maker, Enercon, lost remote connection to approximately 5,800 turbines following a large-scale disruption of satellite links. In April 2022, another company, Deutsche Windtechnik, also lost control of roughly 2,000 turbines due to a cyberattack. While the wind turbines were not damaged during these incidents, these attacks demonstrated the vulnerability of renewable energy control systems.

== Finance ==
Financial infrastructures are increasingly vulnerable to cyberattacks due to their reliance on interconnected computer systems. The financial system's complexity and the constant flow of transactions make it an attractive target for cybercriminals. A significant breach could lead to massive financial losses, erode public trust, and destabilize economies.

The landscape of financial cyber threats has expanded rapidly, with threat actors becoming increasingly sophisticated. According to cybersecurity research, financial sector organizations faced an average of over 1,100 cyberattacks per week globally in the early 2020s, reflecting a significant post-pandemic surge in targeted attacks.

A cyberattack on a financial institution or its transactions may be referred to as a "cyber heist". These attacks often begin with phishing campaigns that exploit social engineering tactics to deceive employees into divulging sensitive information. Once inside the network, attackers can deploy keyloggers to capture login credentials and gain unauthorized access to banking systems.

In February 2013, a global cybercrime network executed a coordinated ATM cash-out heist targeting Oman's Bank of Muscat, stealing US$40 million in under 24 hours. Hackers breached third-party credit card processing systems to eliminate withdrawal limits on prepaid debit cards, enabling coordinated teams in over 20 countries to make thousands of simultaneous cash withdrawals. The operation was part of a broader $45 million scheme that also targeted the United Arab Emirates' National Bank of Ras Al-Khaimah. In March 2025, the hacker group "Code Breakers" breached Iranian Bank Sepah, exposing customer and account records across the institution.

== Transportation ==
Like telecommunications, transportation infrastructure relies on interconnected computer systems for scheduling and operations. Impeding transportation in a city or region has economic consequences. Successful cyber attacks can impact scheduling and accessibility, creating a disruption in the economic chain. In January 2003, during the propagation of the SQL Slammer worm, Continental Airlines was forced to cancel flights and halt check-in systems due to widespread network disruption. In May 2015, Chris Roberts, a former cyber consultant, claimed to the FBI that he had repeatedly managed to hack into the in-flight entertainment system of a Boeing 737 and had at least once ordered a flight to climb. The FBI, after detaining him in April 2015 in Syracuse, had interviewed him about the allegations.

== Water ==
Water and wastewater systems rely on industrial control systems to manage pumps, valves, and chemical treatment processes. Because tampering with these systems can cause immediate public health crises, such as contaminating the drinking water supply or causing raw sewage to be released into the environment, they are considered high-risk targets for cyber-physical attacks.

One of the earliest documented cyberattacks on a water system occurred in 2000 in Maroochy Shire, Queensland, Australia. A former contractor used a stolen laptop and radio equipment to access the sewage control system, releasing millions of liters of raw sewage into local parks, rivers, and the grounds of a hotel.

In February 2021, an incident at a water treatment facility in Oldsmar, Florida, made international headlines when officials announced an attacker had remotely accessed the system and attempted to increase the levels of sodium hydroxide (lye) to lethal amounts. However, subsequent investigations by the FBI and city officials later concluded there was no evidence of a cyberattack, and that the incident was a false alarm caused by an internal operator error. Regardless, the event became a high-profile case study on the vulnerabilities of using poorly secured remote access software in critical infrastructure.

In 2024, multiple US water facilities had their industrial equipment compromised by hackers to display anti-Israel messages. Although it resulted in no major damage, the mass attack revealed security vulnerabilities in the United States' water facilities due to a lack of funding and resources.

== Waste management ==
In 2023, Radioactive Waste Management (RWM), a government-owned company in the United Kingdom, experienced an unsuccessful cybersecurity breach via LinkedIn. Threat actors used the platform in an attempt to map and access the company's personnel network.

Also in 2023, an investigation by The Guardian alleged that Sellafield, the UK's largest and most hazardous nuclear waste disposal site, had been targeted by state-sponsored threat actors linked to Russia and China. The report alleged that sleeper malware had been embedded in site networks as early as 2015, compromising sensitive documents such as emergency defense plans and waste management protocols, and that senior management had failed to address known vulnerabilities for years. In October 2024, following a prosecution brought by the Office for Nuclear Regulation (ONR), Sellafield Ltd was fined £332,500 in court for systemic cybersecurity failures spanning 2019 to 2023, though regulators noted there was no evidence that operational safety or national security had been compromised.

Beyond active facilities, the disposal of electronic waste (e-waste) presents additional cybersecurity risks. PricewaterhouseCoopers (PwC) estimates that by 2030, the proliferation of Internet of Things (IoT) devices will result in the generation of 70 million metric tons of e-waste globally. Much of this discarded hardware contains components that retain sensitive or unencrypted personal data, allowing cybercriminals to target e-waste to gain unauthorized access to organizational networks.

== Hospitals and medical facilities ==
Cyberattacks on hospital infrastructure pose severe risks to patient safety by denying healthcare workers access to critical care systems and electronic health records. A major precedent occurred during the 2017 WannaCry ransomware attack, which severely disrupted the United Kingdom's National Health Service (NHS), locking staff out of systems across more than 80 facilities and forcing the cancellation of thousands of operations and appointments. Threat activity against medical facilities escalated significantly during the COVID-19 pandemic, as ransomware operators exploited overburdened systems to demand payouts for key restoration.

Healthcare networks are vulnerable due to their reliance on third-party vendors and interconnected IoT devices, such as facility security cameras and networked medical equipment. Attackers frequently exploit these external access points to breach primary networks. Furthermore, the shift toward remote work during the pandemic expanded the attack surface by introducing new entry vectors through remote access software.

Cybercriminals target medical institutions to encrypt and exfiltrate Protected Health Information (PHI) and personally identifiable information (PII). Stolen health data is particularly lucrative on illicit markets because it contains permanent identifiers (such as Social Security numbers, banking details, and home addresses) that facilitate identity theft. The widespread adoption of Electronic Medical Records (EMR) has increased the volume of sensitive data managed by these facilities, necessitating stronger safeguards.

To mitigate these threats, the healthcare sector has increasingly adopted Zero Trust architectures, which enforce continuous identity verification for all users and devices requesting network access. In the United States, healthcare providers are legally required under the Health Insurance Portability and Accountability Act (HIPAA) and the HITECH Act to safeguard patient privacy and report data breaches. The HIPAA Omnibus Rule extends these security mandates to third-party vendors and contractors handling patient data.

== See also ==
- Critical infrastructure protection
- Cyberwarfare
- Industrial control system
- SCADA Strangelove
