= Message Handling System =

Early email protocol

Message Handling System (MHS) is an important early email protocol developed by Action Technologies, Inc. (ATI) in 1986. Novell licensed it in 1988 then later bought it.

== Email clients ==
A wide variety of email clients used MHS, including:

- Para-Mail - Paradox Development introduced version 2.0 along with Novell at Comdex 1986.
- DaVinci Email - The first Microsoft Windows-based email client used MHS natively.
- Pegasus Mail - A free mail client, this used MHS its native protocol.
- ExpressIT! and ExpressIT! 2000 - Infinite Technologies' MHS compliant email clients.
- FirstMail - A cut-down version of Pegasus Mail, bundled with some versions of NetWare.
- Futurus TEAM - Early groupware package offering an MHS compliant email client.
- MacAccess - An Apple Macintosh MHS-based email client.

== Role as a gateway ==
MHS was a very 'open' system, and this, with Novell's encouragement, made it popular in the early 1990s as a 'glue' between not only the proprietary email systems of the day such as PROFS, SNADS, MCI, 3+Mail, cc:Mail, Para-Mail and Microsoft Mail, but also the competing standards-based SMTP and X.400. However, by 1996 it was very clear that SMTP over the Internet would take over this role.

== Work-alike products ==
A compatible family of products from Infinite Technologies (now Captaris) and marketed under the name Connect2 were also very widely used as part of MHS-based email networks.

== Decline ==
Novell became increasingly less supportive after their 1994 purchase of WordPerfect as they worked to transform WordPerfect Office into GroupWise.

At about the same time, confidence in the future of X.400 collapsed and SMTP email across the public internet became the compelling choice for mail between unrelated organisations, replacing MHS's former "glue" role.
