= Mercury Mail Transport System =

Email server

Mercury Mail Transport
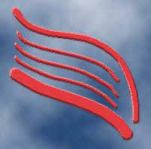
- Developer(s): David Harris
- Initial release: 1993
- Stable release: 4.90 / October 15, 2021
- Operating system: Microsoft Windows
- Type: E-mail server
- License: Donationware/shareware
- Website: http://www.pmail.com/

Mercury Mail Transport System (Mercury MTS) is a standards-compliant mail server developed by David Harris, who also develops the Pegasus Mail client.

It was freeware prior to January 2007, but is now donationware for non-commercial and personal use, and shareware for other uses.

== Versions ==
There are two versions of Mercury with similar functionality. The original version, no longer under development, is a set of NetWare Loadable Modules (NLMs) which runs on all versions of the Novell NetWare network operating system (NOS) from 3.x to 6.x (current as of August 2009). It worked in conjunction with MS-DOS workstations running Pegasus Mail.

Mercury/32 is a Win32 application running on all versions of Microsoft Windows from Windows 98 and Windows NT4 to the latest (as of August 2009) Windows Vista and Windows Server 2008 (Windows XP or Windows Server 2003 are recommended).

Either version can act as a mail server for a LAN; both have additional support for some NetWare LAN features. Mercury is a fully independent mail server and can provide email services to all standards-compliant email clients, such as Eudora or Microsoft Outlook. Both versions of Mercury are highly modular, allowing support for different sets of Internet protocols to be installed as required. Mercury can also be installed tightly integrated with Pegasus Mail. The combination of Pegasus/Mercury is similar to the mail aspects of Microsoft Outlook/Microsoft Exchange Server. Mercury was originally developed to handle mail, both internal and external, on Netware servers in either bindery or NDS mode; Mercury ran on the system server, and integrated with Pegasus mail running on MS-DOS or Windows workstations.

== Features ==
Mercury is extremely standards-compliant, supporting all major Internet mail-related protocols including SMTP (for both sending and receiving mail), POP3 and IMAP. The Win32 version also supports a dialup connection. Both versions have many features, with especially powerful support for managed mailing lists. Mercury is intended to be largely unobtrusive and needs little ongoing maintenance.

The installation process is a simple task, taking less than a minute. At this point, the user must indicate the domain parameter to be used. The user list is manually administered. There is no limit in numbers of users declared. A single directory holds users storage locations, so to do a backup just copy the "mail" directory and it will copy all users' data.

Also, a standard anti-virus could be used. After a mail is received, two files are created. When these files are finally written to disk, a simple antivirus engine could scan it. There is CLAMAV antivirus engine supplied, to be used as desired.

The software has an enormous variety of configurations. Using proper care, the server could be very secure. The relay control is very effective, and the ability to filter mails based in many rules, making it very efficient. Could use blacklist/whitelist technology. There are included tools to reduce spam effects.

=== Protocols supported ===
- SMTP (server, relay-based client and full end-to-end delivery client)
- POP3 (server and distributing client)
- IMAP4rev1 (with multiple simultaneous access to the same mailbox)
- PH (server, for directory lookups)
- Finger (server, for directory lookups)
- PopPass (server, for remote password changing)
- HTTP (server, for web-based mailing list management)
- SSL (Secure sockets layer) on SMTP, POP3 and IMAP servers
- Mercury/32 4.73 can run as a MS Windows service

=== Extensions ===
Mercury/32, while not open source software, can be extended by anyone as the development documentation is free and publicly available at the pmail community. Below are some well known extensions, some bundled with Mercury/32.

- GrayWall, a graylisting interface from Lukas Gebauer
- SpamHalter, Bayesian spam filtering from Lukas Gebauer
- ClamWall virus filter interface from Lukas Gebauer
- Lindby, Rolf (21 June 2008). "Web tools for Mercury/32 which enable web administration". PMAIL COMMUNITY. Archived from the original on 28 December 2019.

== Development status ==
Development on the version for Netware had basically stopped after the release of version 1.48 on 26 May 2000, and replacement by the Windows version was recommended. (A security patch, bringing the Mercury NLM version to 1.49, was released in August 2007.)

On 19 June 2009 David Harris announced on the Pegasus Mail site that all development of Pegasus Mail and the associated Mercury program could only continue if sufficient users would commit to donating US$50 annually; on 21 July 2009 he said that there had been a good start.

New versions of both programs have been released since. Developer David Harris said in April 2017 that both Pegasus Mail and the Mercury transport system were under active and major further development. In July 2019 he announced that the "Mercury v5 is very near to going into beta". On 25 December 2019 he said that, while there has been a delay due to health issues, he "can only promise you that there is progress, and that [he is] totally committed to getting these new versions released" and he is working, among others, on support for OAuth2 and OpenSSL v 1.1.1 and he expects "to have builds of Mercury v5 available to testers and interested users in the first three months of the New Year".

== XAMPP ==
The XAMPP is an initiative by Apache Friends to develop a cross-platform web server solution pack with the main core components of the Apache HTTP Server, MariaDB or MySQL database and the PHP and perl interpreters, intended to be a cross platform equivalent of the LAMP stack used on Linux. While mail systems are natively distributed with the Linux operating system this was not the case for the Microsoft Windows platform and Apache Friends selected Mercury MTS for this component. There are no specific documents provided by Apache Friends for installation or configuration of XAMPP or its components with the concept of providing information via FAQs and forums, however some third party descriptions of the configuration and use of the Mercury MTS component are available.
