= Sergey Boldyrev =

Russian musician (born 1991)

Sergey Boldyrev Сергей Сергеевич Болдырев
- Also known as: Cloudy
- Born: Sergey Sergeevich Boldyrev; 10 May 1991 (age 34); Russia, USSR
- Genres: Rock
- Occupations: rock-musician, guitarist, singer
- Instrument: Guitar
- Years active: since 2004
- Website: https://cloudmaze.ru

Sergey Sergeevich Boldyrev (10 May 1991 Moscow) is a Russian musician, vocalist, guitarist, and song author who founded the Cloud Maze experimental rock-band.

== Biography ==
Boldyrev was born on 10 May 1991 in Moscow. At age seven, he started taking vocal lessons and at age 13 started writing songs.

In 2007, Boldyrev finished school and entered Financial University, seeking to become an economist. By age 23, he had graduated with two higher education diplomas, also finishing RANEPA .

== Music career ==
=== The Shame ===
In 2004 Boldyrev founded the band The Shame. In 2006, The Shame held its first concert in Moscow. In 2007, The Shame appeared in concert with Undervud . In 2009, The Shame broke up.

=== Cloud Maze ===
After the breakup of The Shame, Boldyrev started a new band, Cloud Maze. In 2010, Cloud Maze band performed at a festival in Eupatoria with Aria.

In 2013, Cloud Maze started playing experimental pop-rock. In May 2013, the band went on an Italian tour, playing in Milan, Brescia, and Peschiera del Garda. They were interviewed by two Italian radio stations. In October 2013, Cloud Maze toured with Adaen in Russia and Ukraine.

In fall 2014, Cloud Maze released its debut album Maybe, U Decide. In October 2014, Cloud Maze toured Europe in support of the debut album. They performed in the Czech Republic, Italy, France, The Netherlands, Belgium and Germany. They conducted radio interviews during the tour.

In 2015, Rolling Stone magazine published an article about Boldyrev and Cloud Maze. In March 2015, Boldyrev was interviewed by Jamendo. In May 2015, Cloud Maze performed at the All That Matters music festival in Singapore. That same year, they participated in a music festival in Crocus City Hall in Krasnogorsk, Russia.

In 2016, Cloud Maze was nominated for two music awards:

- Oops! Choice awards
- Real Award MusicBox

In 2017, Cloud Maze won the Jagermeister Music Awards 2017 and the music award in "People's Choice awards: Russia" nomination.

== Awards ==
- Oops! Choice awards 2016
- Jagermeister Music Awards 2017
- People's Choice awards: Russia

== Bands ==
1. "Cloud Maze" rock-band (2013 – current)

2. "The Shame" rock-band (2004–2013)

== Videography and clips ==
- Fall 2016, clip "TTL" on Russian MusicBox and Muzika pervogo channels.
- Summer 2016, clip "Trick" on Russian MusicBox channel.
- Winter 2016, clip "Winter" on Russian MusicBox, NASHE TV and Muzika pervogo channels.
- Summer 2018, clip "Kleptocussion" broadcasting at Muzika pervogo channel.
- January 2019, "Doctor" clip release on 2x2 Music channel

== TV Projects Participation ==
- In 2011, "Zvannij Uzhin" project on "Ren TV" channel
- In 2012, on Mtv channel
- In February, 2013, "10 causes to fall in love" TV program on "Ю" channel
- "Perfect Proposal" on "Ю" channel
- 2016, "Fashion Police" project on "CTC" channel
- 2016, "Friday" channel
- "Baryshnya Krestjanka" TV program

== Sources ==
- ru:Болдырев, Сергей Сергеевич
- https://cloudmaze.ru
- ru:Cloud Maze
- http://allreport.ru/muzyka/v-zaoblachnom-labirinte-s-gruppoj-cloud-maze/
- http://eclectic-magazine.ru/skandalnyj-klip-gruppy-cloud-maze/
- https://www.jamendo.com/artist/462768/cloud-maze?language=ru
- https://twitter.com/cloudmaze
- https://radiomayak.ru/persons/person/id/218385/
- http://www.chelmusic.ru/bands/2051.php
