= Pegasus Mail =

Proprietary email client

- Version 4.80 running in Windows 10
- Developer: David Harris
- Release: December 1989; 36 years ago
- Stable release: 4.91 / 8 September 2025
- Written in: C++/C
- Operating system: Win32 (previously for Novell NetWare, MS-DOS, Win16, Classic Mac OS)
- Platform: Windows
- Size: ~ 12 MiB (download size, English v 4.73)
- Available in: English, German
- Type: Email client
- License: Donationware
- Website: www.pmail.com

Pegasus Mail is a proprietary email client for Windows. It was originally released in 1990 on NetWare networks with MS-DOS and later Mac clients, before being ported to Windows which is now the only platform actively supported. Since its inception it has been developed by David Harris and is donationware after having previously been freeware.

The software has been described as "one of the web's oldest and most respected email clients". It is supported by an official community-driven forum.

== History ==
Pegasus Mail (also shortened to Pmail) was originally launched as ComNet Mail for Novell NetWare MS-DOS workstations in February 1990, a text-mode application for networks. Harris designed it first at the University of Otago's NetWare network. He soon afterwards started developing the Mercury Mail Transport System.

Pegasus Mail pioneered many features now taken for granted with other email clients, such as filtering and simultaneous access to multiple POP3 and IMAP4 accounts. Its extensive array of features coupled with a simple user interface provided an ideal mix for most users' needs. However, the free distribution of Microsoft Outlook Express or later email client as a standard part of Microsoft Windows since Windows 98, and the distribution of Microsoft Outlook, initially free of charge with PC magazines and then as an integral part of Microsoft Office, from 1997 dealt a significant blow to the market share of Pegasus Mail for Windows and other email clients, from which many never fully recovered.

Pegasus Mail for Microsoft Windows was first released in 1993. The development of versions for DOS (MS-DOS and PC DOS 5.0 and higher), Apple Macintosh and 16-bit Windows (Windows 3.1 and higher) stopped in or before 2000.

=== Move to donationware ===
Until 2006 all versions of Pegasus Mail were supplied free of charge, and printed user manuals were available for purchase. In January 2007 it was announced that distribution and development of Pegasus Mail had ceased due to inadequate financial support from the sale of the manuals. Harris stated:

We regret this decision, but ongoing difficulties with funding have forced it upon us

Later in the month, due to an "avalanche" of support from the user community, it was announced that development would resume. However, Pegasus Mail would change from freeware to donationware and Mercury would change to a licence for fee for configurations with more than a certain number of email boxes.

In 2009, Pegasus Mail launched its own Wiki (WikiPmail), used as an online knowledge and documentation resource. A few years later it crashed and has not been restored, but the WikiPmail remains accessible at the Internet Archive.

== Features ==
Pegasus Mail is suitable for single or multiple users on stand-alone computers and for internal and Internet mail on local area networks. Since Pegasus Mail does not make changes to the Windows registry or the system directory, it is suitable as a portable application for USB drives.

A significant feature of Pegasus Mail in Windows is that users have the choice not to use Microsoft Internet Explorer's HTML layout engine when displaying HTML email. Malicious HTML tends to be highly dependent on the exact target application and OS, therefore by avoiding both the ubiquitous HTML renderer supplied with Windows and not allowing automation commands such as ActiveX and JavaScript to execute from within an email in its inbuilt renderer, Pegasus reduces substantially the risk of infection from viewing email. (Note that this is not the same as the risk of malicious email or email attachments if opened outside Pegasus.)

Pegasus has the facility, not provided by all mail clients, optionally to download headers only, allowing the user to select mail to ignore for now and deal with later, download and delete from the server (normal mail operation for POP3 access), download a copy of a message while leaving it on the server, or delete without downloading. Mail may be marked by the user as read or unread, overriding the default setting.

Trends in interface design also changed over the years, and Pegasus Mail did not follow those changes, still having essentially the same user interface it had in its first Windows version, with very few later additions (such as the "preview window" mode).

=== Supported protocols ===
Pegasus Mail supports the POP3, IMAP, and SMTP protocols as well as Novell's MHS. Release 4.41 added support for filtering of spam with header and body checking for key phrases (already before download). Release 4.41 also has, amongst other features, an improved HTML rendering engine, better support for special character encoding (especially with UTF-8), phishing protection, and a full-fledged Bayesian spam filter.

Pegasus Mail for Windows can be used as a standalone mail client using POP3 or IMAP for incoming mail and SMTP for outgoing, or on a NetWare or Windows network in conjunction with the Mercury Mail Transport System for Windows or NetWare, also by David Harris, running on a network server to receive mail and distribute it to users. While Pegasus Mail and Mercury handle email only, the function of Pegasus Mail is comparable to Microsoft Outlook's mail handling, and Mercury to Microsoft Exchange Server.

=== Advanced features ===
Pegasus Mail's takes an "old-fashioned" approach with advantages for knowledgeable users with complex email usage patterns, or who need special features. Some examples include:

- support for three encoding standards (MIME, uuencoding and BinHex);
- a powerful filtering system, so much so that it is possible to run a fully automated client-based electronic mailing list (including processing subscribe and unsubscribe requests and forwards to moderation) using solely Pegasus Mail;
- the ability to automatically select which email address to send a reply from, based on the mail folder containing the original received message;
- the ability to include custom e-mail header lines (useful for tracking emails, for example);
- the ability to delete attachments without deleting the message's text body, or to delete the HTML version of a message while keeping the plain-text version, or vice versa, saving disk space;
- easy access to a message, including all headers, in raw form, which is difficult or impossible in some other clients;
- a "tree view" of the structure of a multipart message with all its sections and attachments, giving access to view or save any of the parts separately
- support for downloading headers only, then deciding for each message whether to download, delete, or leave for later ("Selective mail download"). It is possible to download a message in full without deleting it from the server.

== Version history ==
The early versions of Pegasus were installed on MS-DOS or Mac workstations on a NetWare network (and their Message Handling System (MHS) mail system), and supported only mail between network users; for external (Internet), Mercury for Netware was required. A cut-down MHS-only version called FirstMail was bundled with NetWare.

Early versions used only a proprietary non-standard format (.pmj, .cnm). for mail folders; later versions offer the standard Unix mailbox format (.mbx) as an alternative.

The latest released versions for DOS (3.50, released in or around June 1999) and 16-bit Windows (3.12b, released on 24 November 1999) are available for download. (Version 3.12c for 16-bit Windows was in beta-testing during 2000 but has not been released.) The Mac version (2.21 from 1997) can be found on some FTP servers that in the past offered an official Pegasus mirror service.

Pegasus runs under Linux using the Wine compatibility layer.

Pegasus Mail for Windows
Major version	Initial release
1.x	1993
2.x	1995
3.x	1999
4.x	2001
5.x	Not yet public

=== Version 4.x ===
Pegasus Mail v4.0 was released at the end of 2001, with "more than 2500 changes or fixes". All versions since have been 4.xx; David Harris has been continuously developing v5.0 but it has been delayed. Version 5 is slated to have a completely overhauled contactbook and mail folder system.

A public beta test version of version 4.5 was announced on 3 October 2008 which was stated to be "very complete and stable, but is provided without formal technical support - you should almost certainly apply due diligence testing to it before using it in a production environment". The new version had not only been developed further beyond earlier versions, but had been ported from now obsolete v5.02 of Borland C++ to Microsoft Visual Studio 2008, a major undertaking in itself. On 3 July 2009 Pegasus Mail 4.51. On 23 January 2010 Pegasus Mail 4.52 was released, which included improvements for Windows 7.

On 2 November 2010 Harris posted a message regarding the progress of development on the next release of Pegasus Mail, PMail Version 5.0. He said "We hope to release an initial version of Pegasus Mail version 5 with the new contact manager in place either late in December this year, or early in 2011. A subsequent version with the entirely-new message store I have been working on for over a year will follow at a later stage. I'm personally very excited about the new contact manager - I believe it could have an enormous impact on the way many people work in a world of e-mail overload".

On 23 February 2011 Pegasus Mail 4.61 was released. It includes a new HTML renderer which uses the built-in Windows renderer of Internet Explorer, but the BearHTML renderer has also been improved and can be used instead. V. 4.61 included new graphics and an updated interface. v4.62 had improvements to the editor and elsewhere. On 22 December 2011 bug fix version 4.63 became available.

On 8 March 2014 version 4.70 was released. This version includes Hunspell for spelling check and OpenSSL for encryption besides further improvements. v4.71 was released in January 2016. Version 4.72 was released in April 2016. On 7 June 2018 version 4.73 was released. This includes a much improved help file.

On 25 December 2019 Harris said that, while there has been a delay due to health issues, he "can only promise you that there is progress, and that [he is] totally committed to getting these new versions released" and he is working, among others, on support for OAuth2 and OpenSSL v 1.1.1.

On 14 February 2022 a new version 4.80 was released. There were several overall improvements. Some are: OpenSSL was updated to version 1.1.1k, new support for 120dpi screens and an optimization for the HTML editor for better rendering. The anticipated support for OAuth2 was delayed into later this year.

On 11 August 2025 a new version 4.91 was released.

== See also ==
- Comparison of e-mail clients
- Comparison of feed aggregators
- Mercury Mail Transport System
