= Para-Mail =

Email Client

- Developers: Kris Land (designer), Larry West (chief architect), Craig Arnush (software engineer)
- Stable release: 2.16 / July 16, 1989
- Operating system: MS-DOS, Mac, Windows
- Type: E-mail client
- License: Sold

Para Mail was a proprietary, electronic mail client that was developed and maintained by Kris Land and his team. It was originally released in 1985 for MS-DOS, then was subsequently ported to Windows. A version for Macintosh also used to be available.

On January 3, 1990, it was announced that Paradox Development of Para-Mail was acquired by Office Automation Systems later known as OCTuS, Inc.

== Features ==
Para-Mail was suitable for single or multiple users on stand-alone computers or on local area networks. A key feature of Para-Mail was that it supported image scanners, faxes, optical character recognition and voice mail all through one common user interface.

The original version worked with Novell NetWare networks and its Novell's Message Handling System (MHS) mail system; a cut-down MHS-only version called PM-Remote was bundled with NetWare. Early versions used an idiosyncratic format for mail folders; later versions offer the standard Unix mailbox format as an alternative to the historical Para-Mail format.

Para-Mail supported the x.400, x.500 protocols as well as Novell's MHS.

From being the de facto standard email client on Novell NetWare networks, Para-Mail, along with Eudora and others suffered a similar fate to Netscape Navigator when Internet Explorer version 3.0 bundled Microsoft Internet Mail and News version 1.0 free-of-charge within Windows 95.
