= David Harris (software developer) =

- Born: August 1961 (age 65)
- Occupation: Software developer

David Harris (born August 1961) is a New Zealand software developer from Dunedin, New Zealand. He developed the Pegasus Mail client and the Mercury Mail Transport System, and is a former staff member of the University of Otago. He wrote columns for Computerworld between 2000 and 2004.

Harris received a Lifetime Achievement Award at the PC World Awards in Auckland on 15 November 2002.
