= Yury Maksimov =

Russian entrepreneur

Yury Vladimirovich Maksimov
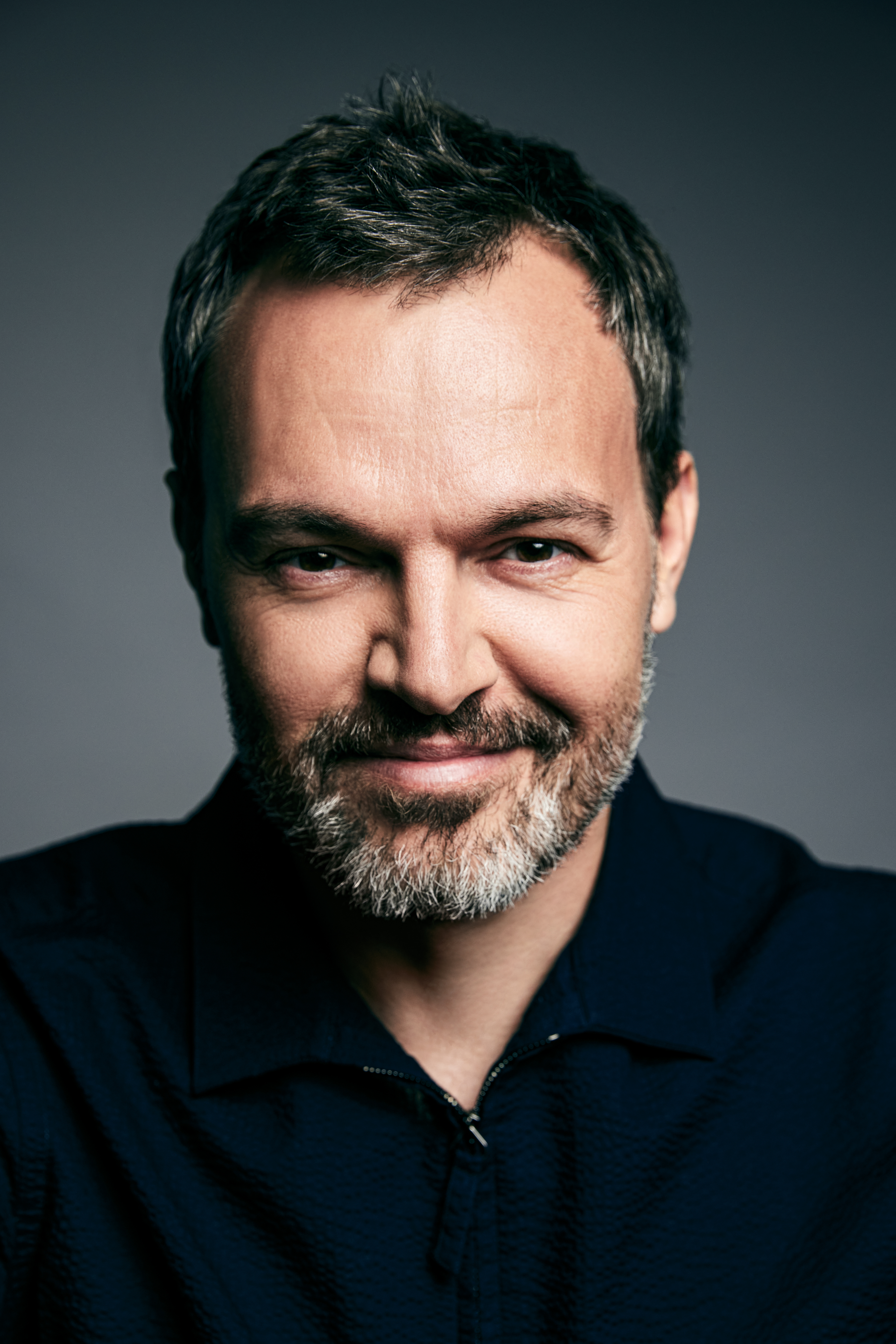
- Born: April 11, 1978 (age 48); Fryazino, Moscow Oblast, USSR
- Citizenship: Russian
- Education: Moscow State University; PhD in physics
- Alma mater: Moscow State University
- Title: Co-founder of Cyberus; Co-founder of Positive Technologies
- Children: One daughter
- Website: https://t.me/yury/

Yury Vladimirovich Maksimov (Russian: Юрий Владимирович Максимов; born April 11, 1978, Fryazino, Moscow Oblast, USSR) is a Russian cyber-entrepreneur, programmer, investor and one of the only three Russian high-tech billionaires to make their fortunes on software.

He is a co-founder and non-controlling shareholder of Cyberus cybersecurity development foundation, and Positive Technologies, a global leader in cybersecurity, where he served as CEO from 2007 to 2021.

In 2021, he was appointed advisor to the Minister for Digital Development, Communications, and Mass Media of the Russian Federation on a voluntary basis.

In July 2024, Maksimov joined the Forbes World's Billionaires list with the total net worth of US$1.2 billion.

== Biography ==
=== Early years ===
Yury Maksimov was born on April 11, 1978, in the scientific town of Fryazino (Moscow Oblast) into a family of engineers. His parents, Vladimir and Lyudmila, worked at the 50th Anniversary of the USSR Plant in Fryazino. He was the family's second son (his elder brother, Dmitry Maksimov, is also a co-founder of Positive Technologies).

In 1995, Maksimov finished school and entered the physics department of Moscow State University. There he developed software for modeling and analyzing problems of information transmission in heterogeneous networks. He graduated as a specialist in this field in 2001.

In 2004, Maksimov completed his post-graduate studies at Moscow State University.

=== Career start ===
Starting in his freshman year, Maksimov combined his studies with a programming job at Oktava+, a maker of precision instrumentation. There he began to develop his own ERP-type software for the company's measuring systems and internal operations, as well as manage international projects for the supply and implementation of foreign solutions for domestic companies and the export of Russian solutions.

== Positive Technologies ==
In 2002, Maksimov co-founded Positive Technologies together with his brother Dmitry and friend Evgeny Kireev. The company's first product was the XSpider vulnerability scanner, developed by Dmitry Maksimov.

The company's first office, located in Altufyevo in northern Moscow, initially had a staff of six: the three founders, a sales manager, an office manager, and a programmer.

=== CEO (2007–2021) ===
From 2004 to 2007, Yury Maksimov served as technical director of Positive Technologies.

In 2007, he took over as CEO of Positive Technologies. The gradual transformation of the shareholder structure led to Maksimov owning more than 50% of the company.

As of April 2024, Yury Maksimov owned 51.9% of the shares of the Positive Group holding.

=== International expansion ===
Having set up its first overseas office in 2011 in the UK, Positive Technologies then opened offices in Italy and South Korea in 2012 and in India, the UAE, Tunisia, and the U.S. in 2013.

In 2014, Maksimov decided to split Positive Technologies into two companies: Russian and Swiss, with an independent development arm in Brno, Czech Republic, and sales offices worldwide. In 2021, it was reported that Yury Maksimov had sold his stake in the foreign legal entities to the top management of the Swiss company.

=== Change of CEO ===
In 2020, Yury Maksimov announced his intention to leave the post of CEO. He entrusted the task of appointing a new CEO to the top management of Positive Technologies. In 2021, after an open discussion, the position was given to Denis Baranov.

=== Positive Technologies goes with a direct listing ===
In 2020, Maksimov announced that Positive Technologies would be listed on the stock exchange.

In December 2021, Positive Group carried out a direct listing on the Moscow Exchange, becoming the first Russian cybersecurity company to go public.

Retaining a majority stake in the company, Yury Maksimov took on the role of chairman of the Board of Directors of PJSC Positive Group.

=== U.S. sanctions ===
On April 15, 2021, U.S. President Joe Biden signed a decree to impose sanctions on six Russian IT companies "that provide support to the Russian Intelligence Services' cyber program." Among them was one of the legal entities of Positive Technologies' Russian structure. The company was accused of supporting government agencies and holding major cybersecurity events which intelligence officers allegedly used to recruit hackers. Maksimov denied all the accusations.

Following the imposition of sanctions, all American contracts with Positive Technologies were terminated. This had almost zero impact on the company's business in Russia.

Maksimov himself is not subject to sanctions.

=== Exit from the Board of Directors ===
From the company’s IPO until 2023, Maksimov served as Chairman of the Board of Directors of Positive Technologies. In 2023, he stepped down from this role and ceased to be the controlling shareholder.

In 2026, he announced his intention to leave the Board of Directors altogether, thereby relinquishing his last corporate position within the company. Despite this, he remains one of the largest non-controlling shareholders of Positive Technologies.

== Cyberus ==
In 2022, Yury Maksimov co-founded Cyberus, an international foundation for result-oriented cybersecurity development. The foundation unites the IT industry, other sectors and governments to boost cybersecurity, work on a new cybersecurity architecture as well as on the creation of sovereign IT products and ecosystems.

The foundation promotes comprehensive cyber exercises, where white-hat hackers are hired to test companies' and governments' resilience against cyber attacks by attempting to breach their critical systems and assessing the real costs of causing non-tolerable damage. Test results are then used to enhance protection, making cyberattacks both extremely difficult and economically unjustifiable.

In June 2025, Cyberus announced the plans to build Cyberdom – a tech hub bringing together experts from IT and cybersecurity fields, government, business and society – in Doha, Qatar. Along with Cyberdom Cyberus plans to establish a Hackademy – a cybersecurity training hub aimed at foster local cybersecurity talent and educate high-skilled professionals. The project is expected to be implemented with a local partner Al-Adid Business, a Qatari investment holding operating in three main sectors – industrial, technology and digital transformation. The company was established by H.E. Sheikh Suhaim Al Thani.

In December 2025, Cyberus announced a deal with VEB.RF, Russia's largest state development corporation. As part of the deal VEB.RF invested RUB 5 billion in Cyberus to support the foundation's development. Cyberus and VEB.RF also agreed to cooperate in developing Russia's technological exports.

== Philanthropy ==
Yury is working on projects that aim to transform the world, making it safer and better for everyone across the entire globe. This activity spans from collaborating with leading IT players and major companies from other industries worldwide on various charity projects to building schools in multiple countries to promote cybersecurity and tech education for youth.

In August 2024, Positive Technologies hosted an exclusive cybersecurity training, bringing together 70 students and cyber enthusiasts from around the globe. Chosen from over 350 applicants, participants dove into cutting-edge cybersecurity techniques and tools. The visionary behind this cross-cultural initiative is Yury Maksimov.

== Personal life ==
Maksimov is married with one daughter.

In 2017, Maksimov completed an Ironman race in Spain, finishing in the top-100.
