= Email migration =

Transfer of email from one email server to another

Email migration is the process in which an email or multiple email messages are transferred from one email server to another email server. A synonymous term is mailbox migration, which includes the migration of additional records such as emails, appointments, contacts, or tasks. In most cases, email migration is required when a user or organization is transitioning from its current email server to a new one, typically as part of an upgrade, cloud adoption, or platform consolidation.

This process is an essential aspect of modern business operations, particularly during digital transformation initiatives. It ensures continuity in communication while enabling businesses to take advantage of new technologies, improve security, and enhance operational efficiency. Email migration often extends beyond simple message transfers, encompassing the movement of entire email systems, which can include calendars, contact lists, and archived messages.

== Scenarios ==
Mailboxes may be migrated for different reasons. For example, mailboxes may need to be migrated because a company wants to use a new email service provider. Or mailboxes may need to be migrated following a company acquisition or merger. In most cases, a simple one-time migration approach may be employed. However, more advanced scenarios exist, including:

- Consolidation: email migration is performed to consolidate multiple accounts into one, for example following an employee's departure.
- Backup: email migration is performed to back up or preserve data, for example, to ensure legal compliance.
- Coexistence: email migration is performed for evaluation purposes, for example during a migration pilot.
- Upgrade: email migration is performed to facilitate an upgrade, for example when deploying a new version of an email system.

== Procedure ==
Various technical procedures are normally used to achieve email migration:

- Email forwarding: this allows a mailbox to forward received content to a designated email address.
- MX record modification: this allows a mail server to process emails on behalf of a designated SMTP domain.
- Content conversion: this allows content to be converted, for example from TNEF to MIME format.
- Property mapping: this allows properties to be mapped, for example from Gmail to Exchange contacts.
- Copy Email: Make a copy of an email from a source mailbox to a destination mailbox

== Features ==
Email migration solutions may implement different features which determine their suitability for different migration scenarios:

- Supported systems: defines the list of source and destination systems supported (ex: IMAP, Gmail, Exchange).
- Administrative logins: allows administrative login to multiple user mailboxes (ex: using OAuth).
- Multi-pass migrations: allows multiple migrations pass without creating duplicates.
- Scalability: allows a large set of mailboxes to be migrated concurrently.
- Monitoring: allows administrators to monitor migration progress and receive alerts.
- Analytics: allows administrators to access statistics such as transfer speed, error rate, etc.
- Reliability: allows the migration process to automatically handle or retry errors during migration.
- Filtering: allows migration of specific content (ex: date range) from specific locations (ex: folders).
- Security: allows migrated content to remain secure, for example using TLS encryption.

== See also ==
- Email service provider
- Email filtering
