= Consumers Software =

Software company based in Canada

- Company type: Subsidiary of Microsoft
- Founded: Canada
- Headquarters: Canada

Consumers Software was a computer networking company based in Canada. The company created early spreadsheet utilities and later developed Network Courier, an email product based on the concept of one or more connected 'post offices'. The post office could be connected to legacy email systems, such as PROFS, DEC and other largely mainframe based email system using connectors.

Consumers Software was one of two companies selling PC-LAN email systems at the time. The other was cc:Mail, based in California.

Consumers Software was acquired by Microsoft on March 18, 1991, and merged its technology with Microsoft Windows and Microsoft Mail for PC Networks. The Network Courier server development group became Microsoft Workgroup Vancouver, part of the Workgroup Computing Division of Microsoft, before being shut down, with its employees relocated to the main Microsoft campus in Redmond, Washington.
