= Positive Technologies =

Russian information security company

- Company type: Public
- Traded as: MCX: POSI
- ISIN: RU000A103X66
- Industry: Information security
- Founder: Yury Maksimov, Dmitry Maksimov, Evgeny Kireev
- Headquarters: Moscow, Russia
- Key people: Denis Baranov, (CEO, 2021- present)
- Operating income: ₽2.08 billion (2021)
- Net income: ₽807 million (2020)
- Number of employees: 1200 (2023)

Positive Technologies is a Russian information security research company and a global leader in cybersecurity. They are the organizer of Positive Hack Days (PHDays).

The Company was founded in 2002 by Yury Maksimov, Dmitry Maksimov and Eugene Kireev.

In 2021, Positive Technologies listed on Moscow Exchange through direct offering, becoming Russia's first public cybersecurity company.

In 2022, the Company ranked 14th among Russia's most valued IT-corporations.
