= Undervud =

Undervud Ундервуд
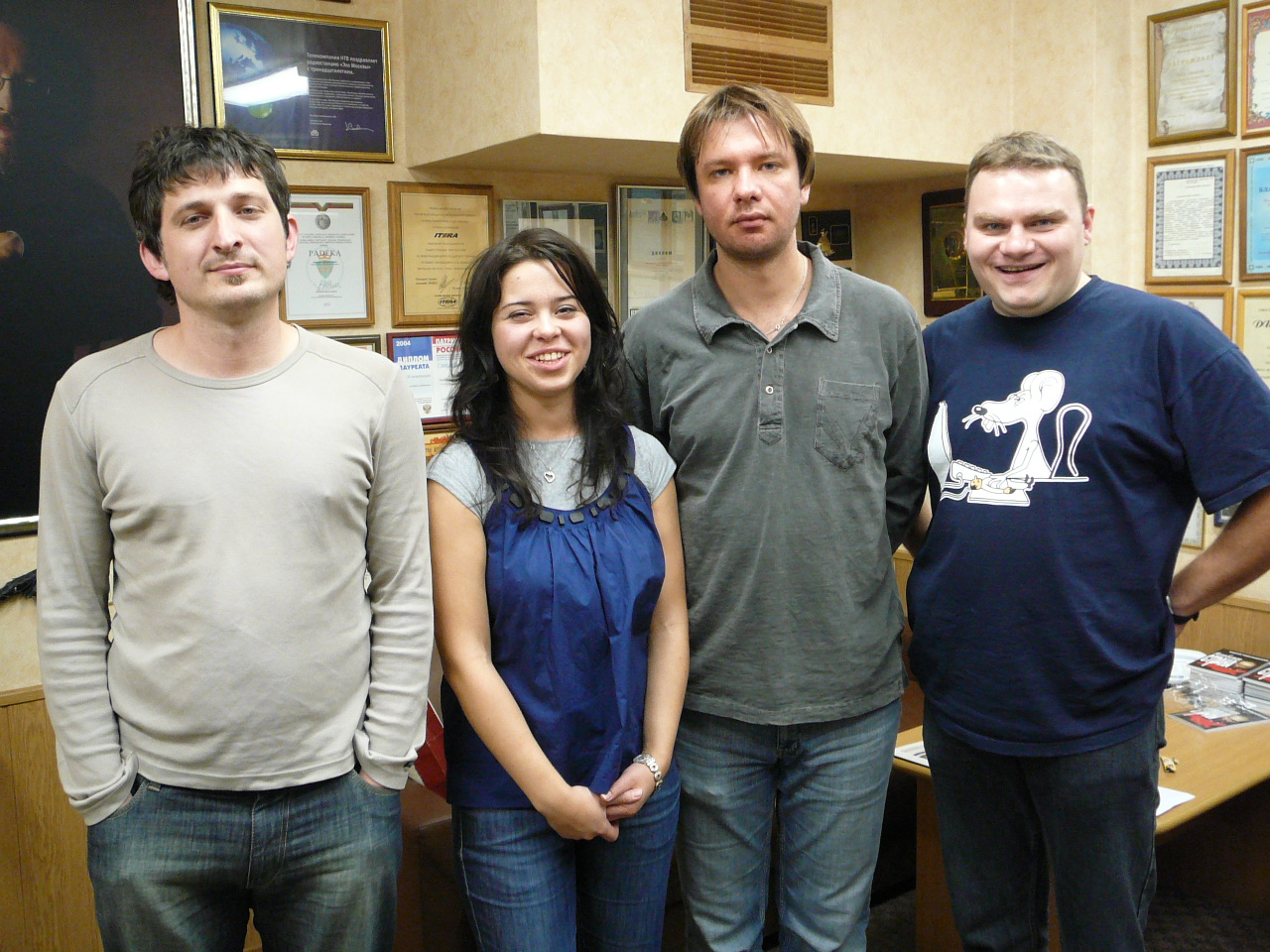

Background information
- Origin: Simferopol, Ukraine
- Genres: rock
- Years active: 1995-
- Members: Maksym Kucherenko, Volodymyr Tkachenko
- Website: Official Website http://www.undervud.ru/

Undervud (Russian: Ундервуд, Russian spelling of Underwood) is a Russian and Ukrainian musical group (alternative rock, indie rock style) established by Maksim Kucherenko (Максим Кучеренко) and Vladimir Tkachenko (Владимир Ткаченко), two medical students from the Crimea. They have released 8 albums, the last one in September 2015.

The soundtracks of the group have been used in several films, cartoons and theatrical performances.

The band's songs are present in the charts of radio stations in Russia and other post-Soviet countries and are also aired by some overseas stations (Israel, United States). Their albums occupy the top places in the final year charts. Undervud is the winner of several musical nominations, among them the Russian “Baker’s dozen” (“Best Album”), “Steppenwolf” (“Best Lyrics” and “Best Song”), Rock Alternative Music Prize and “Song of the Year” (“The most beautiful girl in the world”), according to the radio station Jam FM. Undervud has always been loved by journalists, editors, writers and poets. Undervud is the winner of the International Voloshin Prize “for aesthetics in contemporary music and poetic lyrics”. It is the first musical group to receive such a high praise from the literary community.

== Discography ==
- Vse proydet, milaya (Everything Will Pass by, Darling), 2002
- Krasnaya Knopka (Red Button), 2003
- Bablo pobezhdaet zlo (Money Conquers the Evil), 2005
- Opium dlya naroda (Opium of the People), 2007
- Vse, kogo ty tak sil'no lyubil (Everyone That You Used to Love So Much), 2008
- Babl-gam (Bubble Gum), 2011
- Zhenshiny i Deti (Women & kids), 2013
- Bez Beeregov (Without shore), 2015
- Dieti Potveina (Port Wine Kids), 2019
