= SNADS =

SNADS or Systems Network Architecture Distribution Services is an "asynchronous distribution service that can store data for delayed delivery."

SNADS uses SNA data links to allow messages and objects to be sent from system to system using the APPC protocol. It is a very robust service: once an object has been accepted by SNADS it will get to its destination. If the communication link is unavailable (down), the transmission will be held on the sending system until the link is available, at which time it is sent. If the transmission is interrupted, it will be resumed or re-sent once the communication problem is resolved.

SNADS is available on several IBM platforms, including IBM i, the AS/400 or System/38. Microsoft Exchange Server 5.5 Enterprise Edition includes a gateway called SNA Distribution Services (SNADS) Connector for communication with SNADS networks.

== See also ==
- Systems Network Architecture
