= Windows Server Essentials =

Business software suite by Microsoft

- Windows Server 2019 Essentials displaying the Windows Server Essentials Server Manager
- Developer: Microsoft
- Final release: 2019 / November 13, 2018
- Type: Operating system
- License: Commercial proprietary software
- Website: microsoft.com/windows-server/

Windows Server Essentials (formerly Small Business Server or SBS) is an integrated server suite from Microsoft for businesses with no more than 25 users or 50 devices. It includes Windows Server, Exchange Server, Windows SharePoint Services, and Microsoft Outlook. Application server technologies are tightly integrated to provide and offer management benefits such as integrated setup, enhanced monitoring, Remote Web Workplace, a unified management console, and remote access.

Starting with Windows Server Essentials 2022, this product is only available through OEM providers. This product offers the same licensing terms and restrictions regarding the number of users/devices and cores; however, it also offers the same features as Windows Server Standard 2022.

== History ==
=== As Small Business Server ===
Initially, Microsoft marketed the Small Business Server (SBS) an edition of Microsoft BackOffice Server. With the release of Windows 2000, however, Microsoft spun off Small Business Server 2000 as a separate offering. Until this point, the Premium editions of SBS included SQL Server, ISA Server, and FrontPage. SBS 2003 and later all bear the "Windows" brand and are editions of Windows Server.

SBS 2008 came with an edition of Windows Server 2008 bears the name Windows Server 2008 for Windows Essential Server Solutions ("WinWESS"), also known as Windows Server 2008 Standard FE. This edition of Windows Server 2008 is available outside the product suite, supporting a maximum of 15 Client Access Licenses. SBS 2008 Premium edition does not include ISA Server but includes SQL Server 2008. Those upgrading to SBS 2008 Premium edition via Software Assurance were compensated with a free license for the latest version of ISA Server. In December 2008, Microsoft also introduced a Windows Essential Business Server product aimed at medium-sized businesses, but this was discontinued in June 2010 due to low demand.

SBS 2011 was available in Essentials, Standard, and Premium editions. The Essentials edition is a scaled down version for 1 to 25 users; the other editions are based on the Windows Server codebase and include Exchange Server, Windows SharePoint Services, and Microsoft Outlook in addition to what comes with Windows Server.

A screenshot of Windows Small Business Server 2011 Essentials

=== As Windows Server Essentials ===
Starting with Windows Server 2012, Microsoft renamed SBS to Windows Server Essentials. Four versions of Windows Server Essentials were released along with their Windows Server siblings: 2012, 2012 R2, 2016, and 2019. Windows Server 2019 Essentials removed many features found in previous versions of Windows Server Essentials because the "Windows Server Essentials Experience" role was not included in any of the Windows Server 2019 SKUs. This includes Essentials Connector, Client PC Backup, Office 365 integration, Remote Web Access, and the Windows Server Essentials Dashboard.

=== Discontinuation ===
In September 2018, Microsoft stated that Windows Server Essentials 2019 could be the last version of this product. Following the release of Windows Server 2022, Microsoft announced that Windows Server Essentials 2022 would only be made available to OEMs as a customized licensing scheme for the Standard edition of Windows Server 2022.

At the time of discontinuation, Microsoft offered the same software as part of its Microsoft 365 and Microsoft Azure plans.

== Versions ==
- October 22, 1997 – BackOffice Small Business Server 4.0

Consists of Windows NT Server 4.0 SP3 and includes Exchange Server 5.0 SP1, Internet Information Services 3.0, SQL Server 6.5 SP3, Proxy Server 1.0, Internet Explorer 3.02 or 4.01, and Outlook 97; allows 25 client licenses.

- May 24, 1999 – BackOffice Small Business Server 4.5

Consists of Windows NT Server 4.0 SP4 and includes Exchange Server 5.5 SP2, IIS 4.0, SQL Server 7.0, Proxy Server 2.0, Internet Explorer 5.0, Outlook 2000, and FrontPage 2000; allows 50 client licenses.

- February 21, 2001 – Microsoft Small Business Server 2000

Consists of Windows 2000 Server (including Internet Explorer 5.0 and IIS 5.0) and includes Exchange 2000 Server, SQL Server 2000 Standard Edition, Internet Security & Acceleration Server 2000, Outlook 2000 and FrontPage 2000; allows 50 client licenses.

- October 9, 2003 – Windows Small Business Server 2003 (codenamed Bobcat)

Consists of Windows Server 2003 and includes Microsoft Exchange Server 2003, Microsoft Outlook 2003, Windows SharePoint Services 2.0, and optionally Microsoft SQL Server 2000, ISA Server 2000 (upgrade to ISA Server 2004 in Small Business Server Premium SP1), and Microsoft FrontPage 2003 in Premium edition; allows 75 client licenses. Service Pack 1 for Windows Small Business Server 2003 was released on July 25, 2005.

- July 29, 2006 – Windows Small Business Server 2003 R2

Consists of Windows Server 2003 and includes Microsoft Exchange Server 2003, Microsoft Outlook 2003, Windows SharePoint Services 2.0, and optionally Microsoft SQL Server 2005 Workgroup Edition, ISA Server 2004, and Microsoft FrontPage 2003 in Premium edition; allows 75 client licenses. A major addition is a built-in patch management tool optimized for small businesses, based on Microsoft Windows Server Update Services. Exchange database size limit is set to 18 GB by default but can be expanded to 75 GB using a registry key.

- August 21, 2008 – Windows Small Business Server 2008 (codenamed Cougar)

Consists of Windows Server 2008 and includes Microsoft Exchange Server 2007, Windows SharePoint Services 3.0 and 120-day trial subscriptions of new security products from Microsoft, namely, Forefront Security for Exchange and Windows Live OneCare for Server. The standard edition of SBS 2008 is a single server product for small businesses. The premium edition contains a license for Windows Server 2008 and SQL Server 2008 Standard Edition, with the option to run SQL Server on either the main SBS server, or a second server; it is targeted at dual-server scenarios such as terminal services application sharing, line of business applications, edge security, secondary domain controllers, and virtualization. In addition to features present in previous versions, new features include:
- A streamlined administration and management console that is designed around tasks to be accomplished rather than underlying technologies
- Built-in support for registering and configuring domain name and DNS records via multiple registrars
- Monitoring reports that gather data from both servers and clients on the network, including Security Center status (anti-virus, spyware, and client firewall) from all the clients
- New features in the Remote Web Workplace, such as the ability to define default and allowed PCs for each user
- Office Live Small Business integration for and configuring a public web site or extranet
- New server backup features, based on the incremental block-based backup technology in Windows Server 2008 (tape backup no longer supported via native tools, but continues to be supported via third parties)
- SBS 2008 requires installation behind a separate network firewall device. In contrast with SBS 2003, it does not support being installed directly on the edge of the network, ISA Server is no longer bundled and a dual-NIC configuration is not possible.
- Migration of 32-bit SBS 2003 versions to 64-bit SBS 2008 and SBS2011 has no in place upgrade and can be problematic. Inability to upgrade Sharepoint (WSS 2.0) by WSS 3.0 or SharePoint 2010 Foundation.
SBS 2008 was released to manufacturing on August 21, 2008 and was launched on November 12, 2008. Windows Small Business Server 2008 supports organizations with up to 75 users or devices. A notable change from SBS 2003 is that CALs are not enforced electronically.

- December 13, 2010 – Windows Small Business Server 2011

Microsoft announced two successors to the SBS series during WPC 2010, both based on Windows Server 2008 R2. One successor (code name "Aurora") supports a maximum of 25 users, does not include Exchange, SharePoint and Windows Server Update Services (WSUS), and is oriented to attach cloud services. The other successor (code name "SBS 7") is the more direct successor of SBS 2008, and continues to support a maximum of 75 users, and includes Exchange, SharePoint and WSUS.
Late in 2010, Microsoft announced the official branding for the 2011 wave: SBS "7" became "Windows Small Business Server 2011 Standard," and "Aurora" was christened "Windows Small Business Server 2011 Essentials." Whereas formerly, the premium edition of SBS was packaged as a superset of the standard edition, in the 2011 wave, it was to be available as an add-on, containing standalone copies of SQL Server 2008 R2 and Windows Server 2008 R2. It could be added to either SBS 2011 Essentials or Standard.
In mid-December, Microsoft released SBS 2011 Standard to TechNet and MSDN subscribers for evaluation. Microsoft released SBS 2011 Standard to volume licensing customers in early January and as a trial in mid-January. SBS 2011 requires an Internet connection.

- October 10, 2012 – Windows Server 2012 Essentials

In July 2012, Microsoft announced that there would not be another SBS product. Rather, Windows Server 2012 Essentials succeeded SBS Essentials. Windows Server 2012 Essentials does not include Microsoft Exchange Server, which is used for messaging and collaboration, including the ability to host email. Windows Server Essentials and its successors were designed for small businesses with up to 25 users and 50 devices.

- September 9, 2013 – Windows Server 2012 R2 Essentials
- October 12, 2016 – Windows Server 2016 Essentials
- November 13, 2018 – Windows Server 2019 Essentials

Windows Server 2019 Essentials removed many features found in previous versions of Windows Server Essentials, including Remote Web Access, Essentials Connector, Client PC Backup, Office 365 integration and the Windows Server Essentials Dashboard. It is the last version of Windows Server Essentials.

== Licensing ==
Normally, Microsoft licenses its on-premises server products on a per-seat or per-user basis, i.e., the licensing cost depends on how many users or computers use these products. Businesses that install them require to obtain client access licenses (CALs). Windows Server 2012 Essentials and later do not need any CALs. However, this has not always been the case. Earlier versions – Windows Small Business Server (SBS) – had their own types of CAL, and included the user CALs for Windows Server, Exchange Server, and eventually SQL Server. The SBS CALs cost more than the Windows Server CALs, but less than the sum of separate access licenses for the two or three servers.

Windows Small Business Server has the following design restrictions:

- Only one computer in the domain can run SBS. The domain supports multiple servers (including additional domain controllers) running any other operating system, such as Windows Server, but only one SBS.
- SBS must be the root of the Active Directory forest.
- SBS cannot establish a trust relationship with any other domains or have sub-domains.
- SBS is limited to 75 users or devices depending on the type of CAL.
- SBS 2003 and earlier are limited to no more than 4 GB of RAM. SBS 2008 supports a maximum of 32 GB. It requires a minimum of 4 GB for installation, but needs more for performance.
- SBS 2003 R2 and earlier are only available for the IA-32 (32-bit) architecture.
- SBS 2008 is only available for the x86-64 architecture.
- The SQL Server that comes with SBS 2008 is "SQL Server 2008 Standard Edition for Small Business.". It cannot be installed outside a network that has a domain controller, and must have fewer than 75 PCs or users (depending on the CAL.)
- Remote Desktop Services on SBS is restricted to two simultaneous sessions. (Change from SBS 2000 policy) Terminal Services in application sharing mode needs to be run on a second server running a separately obtained copy of Windows Server.

To remove these restrictions and upgrade to regular editions of Windows Server, Exchange Server, SQL Server and ISA Server, there was a Windows Small Business Server 2003 R2 Transition Pack.
