= Service Pack 2 =

Service Pack 2 may refer to:

- Windows 2000, Service Pack 2
- Windows NT 4.0, Service Pack 2
- Windows Server 2003, Service Pack 2
- Windows Server 2008, Service Pack 2
- Windows Vista, Service Pack 2
- Windows XP, Service Pack 2

Note: Service Pack 2 may also refer to patches released for a number of other Microsoft products.
