= Microsoft BackOffice Server =

Computer software package

- Small Business Server in Microsoft's BackOffice product line
- Developer: Microsoft Corporation
- Initial release: 1994; 32 years ago
- Final release: 2000 / February 28, 2001; 24 years ago
- Operating system: Windows NT Server
- License: Proprietary
- Website: backoffice.microsoft.com at the Wayback Machine (archived 1998-01-21)
- As of: February 2016

Microsoft BackOffice Server is a discontinued computer software package featuring Windows NT Server and other Microsoft server products that ran on NT Server. It was marketed during the 1990s and early 2000s for use in branch operations and for small businesses to run their back office operations. The small business edition of BackOffice Server was released for versions 4.0 and 4.5. In 2000 it was spun off from the "BackOffice" brand, becoming a variant of Windows Server branded as Windows Small Business Server. BackOffice Server itself was discontinued on October 1, 2001.

== Software included ==
Besides Windows NT Server, versions of BackOffice Server suite also included Microsoft SQL Server, Microsoft SNA Server, Microsoft Systems Management Server (SMS), Microsoft Mail Server or Microsoft Exchange Server, Microsoft Proxy Server or Microsoft Internet Security and Acceleration (ISA) Server, and Internet Information Services (IIS). The "Small Business" editions omitted SNA Server and SMS.

== Versions ==
- late 1994 — BackOffice 1.0 – includes Windows NT Server 3.5, Microsoft SQL Server 4.21a, Microsoft SNA Server 2.1, Microsoft SMS 1.0, and Microsoft Mail Server 3.2.
- late 1995 — BackOffice 1.5 – includes Windows NT Server 3.51, Microsoft SQL Server 6.0, Microsoft SNA Server 2.11, Microsoft SMS 1.1, and Microsoft Mail Server 3.5.
- April 25, 1996 — BackOffice 2.0 – includes Windows NT Server 3.51, Microsoft Internet Information Services 1.0, Microsoft SQL Server 6.0 or 6.5, Microsoft SNA Server 2.11, Microsoft SMS 1.1, and Microsoft Exchange Server 4.0.
- December 1996 — BackOffice 2.5 – includes Windows NT Server 4.0, Internet Information Services 2.0, Microsoft SQL Server 6.5, Microsoft SNA Server 3.0, Microsoft SMS 1.2, Microsoft Exchange Server 4.0, Microsoft Proxy Server 1.0, Microsoft Index Server 1.1, Internet Explorer 3.01, and FrontPage 1.1
- December 9, 1997 — BackOffice Server 4.0 – includes Windows NT Server 4.0 SP3, Internet Information Services 3.0, Microsoft SQL Server 6.5, Microsoft SNA Server 4.0, Microsoft SMS 1.2, Microsoft Exchange Server 5.5, Microsoft Proxy Server 2.0, Microsoft Index Server 2.0, Microsoft Transaction Server 2.0, Microsoft Site Server 3.0, Microsoft FrontPage 98, and Visual InterDev 1.0.
- January 12, 1999 — BackOffice Server 4.5 – includes Windows NT Server 4.0 SP4, Internet Information Services 4.0, Microsoft SQL Server 7.0, Microsoft SNA Server 4.0 SP2, Microsoft SMS 2.0, Microsoft Exchange Server 5.5 SP2, Microsoft Proxy Server 2.0, Microsoft Index Server 2.0, Microsoft Transaction Server 2.0, Internet Explorer 5.0, Microsoft FrontPage 2000, and Microsoft Visual InterDev 6.0.
- February 28, 2001 — BackOffice Server 2000 – includes Windows 2000 Server, Microsoft SQL Server 2000, Microsoft SMS 2.0, Microsoft Exchange Server 2000, Microsoft ISA Server 2000, and Microsoft Host Integration Server 2000.

== Requirements ==
BackOffice Server 4.5 with 1 server license and 5 clients access licenses (CAL) was marketed for US$675. It required 2 GB minimum hard drive space, a minimum processor type of Pentium Pro 200 MHz, and a minimum RAM size of 128 MB.

== See also ==
- Windows Small Business Server
- Back Orifice
