= Windows Essential Business Server 2008 =

Server operating system by Microsoft released in 2008

- Version of the Windows NT operating system
- Developer: Microsoft
- Source model: Closed-source; Source-available (through Shared Source Initiative)
- Released to manufacturing: 15 September 2008; 16 years ago
- General availability: 12 November 2008; 16 years ago
- Kernel type: Hybrid kernel
- License: Proprietary / Commercial
- Official website: technet.microsoft.com/en-us/ebs

Support status
- Support status for each component is determined individually.

Windows Essential Business Server 2008 (code named Centro) was Microsoft's server offering for mid-size businesses (up to a maximum of 300 Users and/or Devices). It was released to manufacturing on 15 September 2008 and was officially launched on 12 November 2008. It was discontinued on 30 June 2010.

Originally Windows Essential Business Server 2008 R2 (Codename Cascades) was planned, but it was canceled before release due to low interest in the previous version (Essential Business Server 2008).

== Overview ==
Built from the Windows Server 2008 codebase, two editions are available: Standard and Premium. The Standard edition includes three Windows Server 2008 x64 Standard Servers and on top of those three servers: Microsoft Exchange 2007, Microsoft System Center Essentials, Microsoft Forefront Security for Exchange Server, and Forefront Threat Management Gateway (Medium Business Edition). The Premium edition adds another Windows Server 2008 Standard Edition and the Microsoft SQL Server 2008 Standard database software.

According to Microsoft, Essential Business Server features a single administration/management console, through which the collection of managed clients and servers can be monitored and managed. Third party software can also utilize the same console to present an administration interface to their software. CA Technologies and Symantec will use the management console for their CA ARCserve Backup, Backup Exec and Symantec Endpoint Protection products respectively. Essential Business Server also includes Remote Web Workplace, an out-of-the-box feature that enables IT to easily set up security-enhanced remote access to company client computers and Outlook Web App.

On 5 March 2010, Microsoft announced that due to low demand of the product, it discontinued the offering of Essential Business Server after June 30, 2010. Microsoft has recommended that Essential Businesses use standalone Windows Server 2008 R2, Exchange Server 2010, System Center Essentials 2010, Forefront Security for Exchange Server 2010 and Forefront Threat Management Gateway 2010.

From 30 June 2010 until 31 December 2010, Microsoft offered standalone products of Windows Server 2008 Standard, System Center Essentials 2007, and Exchange Server 2007 to current Essential Business Server customers free of charge (Taxes and shipping charges apply).

== See also ==
- Windows Server Essentials
