= SLPS =

SLPS may refer to:

- Microsoft Software Licensing and Protection Services
- Puerto Suárez International Airport, Bolivia
- St. Louis Public Schools, Missouri

== See also ==
- SLP (disambiguation)
