= Small Business Server =

Small Business Server can refer to:

- Novell Small Business Server
- Windows Small Business Server
