= WID =

WID may stand for:

- River Wid, Essex, England
- Windows Internal Database
- Women in Development
- World Inequality Database
