= Microsoft Forefront Unified Access Gateway =

Unified Access Gateway
- Original author: Whale Communications
- Developer: Microsoft
- Final release: 2010 with SP4 / 27 November 2013; 12 years ago
- Operating system: Windows Server 2008 R2
- Platform: x86-64
- Type: Reverse proxy, virtual private network
- License: Proprietary commercial software
- Website: microsoft.com/uag (Offline)

Minimum system requirements
- CPU: 2.66 GHz; dual core; x86-64-compatible
- Memory: 4 GB
- Hard disk drive space: 2.5 GB
- Operating system: Windows Server 2008 R2 Standard or Enterprise edition
- Other requirements: The computer on which Forefront UAG is being installed should be devoid of all other software except its operating system.

Microsoft Forefront Unified Access Gateway (UAG) is a discontinued software suite that provides secure remote access to corporate networks for remote employees and business partners. Its services include reverse proxy, virtual private network (VPN), DirectAccess and Remote Desktop Services. UAG was released in 2010, and is the successor for Microsoft Intelligent Application Gateway (IAG) which was released in 2007. UAG is part of the Microsoft Forefront offering. Microsoft discontinued the product in 2014, although the Web Application Proxy feature of Windows Server 2012 R2 and later offers some of its functionalities.

== History ==
Unified Access Gateway was originally developed by a startup company named Whale Communications in Rosh HaAyin, Israel. Whale's initial product, e-Gap, was designed to create physical separation between networks of disparate trust levels. It consisted of an appliance housing a 512k memory chip that toggled connections between two servers via a SCSI bus. The product was originally built to offer sneaker-net services and shortly thereafter features to enable HTTP connections were added. In the 90's and early 2000's, e-Gap was enhanced to provide comprehensive reverse proxy features that included in-depth filtering of inbound traffic to ensure the security of the web servers and applications it protected. As adoption grew, the product pivoted to focus more specifically on Remote Access use-cases and additional features and licensing options were added to provide employee and contractor remote access across a range of connectivity options. In 2002, the market evolved into offering more comprehensive SSL VPN features. Whale's uniqueness was in its ability to granularly filter and alter the flow of traffic to enable a path of least access and protect from both known and unknown attacks/vulnerabilities using an application specific positive logic filtering engine.

On 18 May 2006, Microsoft announced that it would be acquiring Whale Communications. Microsoft completed the acquisition on 26 July 2006. Following this acquisition, the product was renamed Microsoft Intelligent Application Gateway Server 2007. With this version, the SCSI-based Air Gap (e-Gap) was dropped, and the product was unified as a single-server appliance. Instead of using the Air Gap as the security barrier, IAG used Microsoft's ISA Server firewall product. IAG was offered to the public as a pre-installed appliance by Celestix Networks, IVO Networks, PortSys and nAppliance. In 2009, with the release of Service Pack 2 for IAG, the product was also offered directly to the public from Microsoft in the form of a virtual appliance (a first of its kind form-factor for Microsoft) - a pre-installed VHD which could be run on Hyper-V or VMware Workstation.

In April 2008, Microsoft announced that the next generation of IAG will be named Forefront Unified Access Gateway (UAG). The product was released on 24 December 2009. UAG's core new functionality centered on its DirectAccess gateway. DirectAccess, launched with Windows 7, was Microsoft's visionary always on VPN which allowed both VPN access and continuous endpoint management and control. At its launch, UAG was the only solution to publishing DirectAccess making the product an integral part of the Windows 7 strategy. Ultimately, these capabilities (and others) were built natively into Windows Server.

Service Pack 1 for this product was released on 3 December 2010. Update 1 for Service Pack 1 was released on 17 October 2011 Service Pack 2 for this product was released on 6 August 2011. Service Pack 3 was released on 19 February 2013. Service Pack 4 was released on 27 November 2013. On 17 December Microsoft has announced that Microsoft will not deliver any future full version releases of Forefront UAG and the product will be removed from price lists on 1 July 2014

== Technical overview ==
Microsoft UAG provides secure socket layer (SSL) virtual private network (VPN), a Web application firewall, and endpoint security management (for compliance and security) that enable access control, authorization, and content inspection for a wide variety of line-of-business applications.

Included are customized granular access policy and security capabilities for Microsoft Exchange Server (2003, 2007 and 2010), Microsoft SharePoint Portal Server (2003, 2007 and 2010), Microsoft Terminal Services and Citrix Presentation Server. The product is highly customizable, and almost any application can be published With UAG.

Out of the box UAG Server is able to work with many authentication vendors such as Mi-Token, RSA Security, OneSpan, GrIDsure, Swivel, ActivCard and Aladdin. It also works with numerous authentication systems and protocols such as Active Directory, RADIUS, LDAP, NTLM, Lotus Domino, PKI and TACACS+. Possible customizations include single-sign-on (SSO), as well as look-and-feel dynamic customization. With the current release of UAG with Update 2, the product also offers support for many third-party systems such as Linux, Macintosh and iPhone. The product also supports Mozilla Firefox.

UAG performs particularly well in providing a portal for web applications, such as web-based email and intranets, but it also provides full SSL VPN network access using either ActiveX (when using Internet Explorer) or Java components (when using Firefox, Opera, non Windows client such as Red Hat or Mac OS). These components can also perform end-point compliance checks before allowing access, to test for attributes on the PC such as domain name, antivirus definitions date or running processes.

The inclusion of DirectAccess contributes to UAG's success, with its services including a VPN-like integration. DirectAccess is part of Windows with a configuration interface for administrators. UAG also adds two additional components - DNS64 and NAT64, which assists the deployment of DirectAccess in an existing network without the need to deploy IPv6.

The product is sold in appliance form, from various vendors. It is also offered as an installable DVD. The product can be installed on Windows Server 2008 R2.

== Version History ==
Version	Release date	Version number	Reference
General availability	25 January 2010	4.0.1101.0	—N/a
Sec Update MS10-089	9 Nov 2010	4.0.1101.052	
Update 1	12 April 2010	4.0.1152.100	
U1 Rollup 1	18 May 2010	4.0.1152.110	
U1+Sec Update MS10-089	9 Nov 2010	4.0.1152.150	
Update 2	21 September 2010	4.0.1269.200	
U2+Sec Update MS10-089	9 Nov 2010	4.0.1269.250	
Service Pack 1 RC	21 October 2010	4.0.1575.10000	?
Service Pack 1	14 January 2011	4.0.1752.10000	
Service Pack 1 Rollup 1	3 February 2011	4.0.1752.10020	
Service Pack 1 Rollup 2 (a.k.a. Q1 2011 Rollup)	6 April 2011	4.0.1752.10025	?
Security Update MS11-079	12 October 2011	4.0.1752.10073	
SP1 + Sec Update MS12-026	10 April 2012	4.0.1753.10076	
Service Pack 1 Update 1	13 October 2011	4.0.1773.10100	
Service Pack 1 Update 1 Rollup 1	11 January 2012	4.0.1773.10110	
SP1 U1 + Sec Update MS12-026	10 April 2012	4.0.1773.10190	
Service Pack 1 Update 1 Rollup 2	12 June 2012	4.0.1773.10220	?
Service Pack 2	6 August 2012	4.0.2095.10000	
Service Pack 3	20 February 2013	4.0.3123.10000	
Service Pack 3 Rollup 1	15 April 2013	4.0.3206.10100	
Service Pack 4	27 November 2013	4.0.4083.10000	
Service Pack 4 Rollup 1	28 October 2014	4.0.4160.10100	
Service Pack 4 Rollup 2	19 June 2015	4.0.4205.10200	

== See also ==
- Microsoft Forefront
