= Windows Server 2012 R2 =

Version of Windows Server, released in 2013

- Version of the Windows NT operating system

- Screenshot of Windows Server 2012 R2, showing the Server Manager application which is automatically opened when an administrator logs on, start button, taskbar, and the blue color of Aero Lite
- Developer: Microsoft
- OS family: Windows Server
- Working state: No longer supported
- Source model: Closed source / Shared source
- Released to manufacturing: August 27, 2013; 13 years ago
- General availability: October 17, 2013; 12 years ago
- Latest release: October 2026 monthly update rollup (6.3.9600.23470) / October 13, 2026; 0 days ago
- Marketing target: Business
- Update method: Windows Update, Windows Server Update Services, SCCM
- Supported platforms: x86-64
- Kernel type: Hybrid (Windows NT kernel)
- Default user interface: Windows shell (GUI)
- License: Commercial proprietary software
- Preceded by: Windows Server 2012 (2012)
- Succeeded by: Windows Server 2016 (2016)
- Official website: Windows Server 2012 R2 (archived at Wayback Machine)

Support status
- Mainstream support ended on October 9, 2018; Extended support ended on October 10, 2023; Paid support via the Extended Security Updates program ended on October 13, 2026, only for volume licensed editions.

Windows Server 2012 R2, codenamed "Windows Server Blue", is the tenth major version of the Windows NT operating system produced by Microsoft to be released under the Windows Server brand name. It was unveiled on June 3, 2013, at TechEd North America, and released on October 17 of the same year. It is the successor to Windows Server 2012, and is based on the Windows 8.1 codebase. It is the final version of Windows Server to use the "R2" suffix, which had been used since the release of Windows Server 2003 R2.

It removed support for processors without CMPXCHG16b, PrefetchW, LAHF and SAHF.

A further update, formally designated Windows Server 2012 R2 Update, was released in April 2014. It is a cumulative set of security, critical and other updates. Windows Server 2012 R2, like previous versions of Windows Server before it and versions after it, is only compatible with 64-bit processors.

It was succeeded by the Windows 10-based Windows Server 2016. Mainstream support ended on October 9, 2018, and extended support ended on October 10, 2023. It was eligible for the paid Extended Security Updates (ESU) program, which offered continued security updates until October 13, 2026.

== Features ==
Windows Server 2012 R2 Start Screen, including Internet Explorer 11 and essential tools for use in a server

The following features are introduced in Windows Server 2012 R2:

- Automated Tiering: Storage Spaces stores most frequently accessed files on fastest physical media
- Deduplication for VHD: Reduces the storage space for VHD files with largely similar contents by storing the similar contents only once
- Windows PowerShell v4, which now includes a Desired State Configuration (DSC) feature
- Integrated Office 365 support (Essentials edition)
- User interface changes reflecting Windows 8.1, including visible Start button.
- UEFI-based virtual machines
- Upgrades from driver emulators to synthetic hardware drivers to minimize legacy support
- Faster VM deployment (approximately half the time)
- Internet Information Services 8.5: Support for logging to Event Tracing for Windows and the ability to log any request/response headers. To improve scalability, if IIS is configured with 100 or more web sites, by default it will not automatically start any of them. Alongside this, a new "Idle Worker Process Page-Out" configuration option has been added to application pools to instruct Windows to page-out the process if it has been idle for the idle time-out period (by default, 20 minutes).
- Server Message Block: Performance and event logging quality improvements, support for Hyper-V Live Migration over SMB, bandwidth prioritization management, and the ability to remove SMB 1.0 support
- Windows Deployment Services: Support for managing WDS via PowerShell.
- Windows Defender is available in a Server Core installation, and is installed and enabled by default.
- IP Address Management (IPAM): Extended to support role-based access control, allowing for fine-grained control over which users can view or change configurations for DHCP reservations, scopes, IP address blocks, DNS resource records, etc. Additionally, IPAM can integrate with System Center Virtual Machine Manager 2012 R2 to have coordinated IP policy across both physical and virtual environments. The IPAM database can be stored in a SQL Server instance instead of Windows Internal Database.
- Group Policy has a new "Policy Cache" setting which allows domain-joined machines to store a copy of the group policy settings on the client machine and, depending on the speed of access to the domain controller, use those at startup time instead of waiting for the policy settings to download. This can improve startup times on machines that are disconnected from the company network. New Group Policy settings have been added to cover new features in Windows 8.1 and Internet Explorer 11, such as enabling/disabling SPDY/3 support, configuring start screen layouts, and detecting phone numbers in web pages.
- TLS support is extended to support RFC 5077, "Transport Layer Security (TLS) Session Resumption without Server-Side State", which improves performance of long-running TLS-secured connections that need to reconnect due to session expiration.
- Hyper-V role and Hyper-V management console are added to the Essentials edition.
- Windows Server Update Services was made available for Windows Server 2012 R2 Essentials edition.
- ReFS gained support for alternate data streams and automatic error-correction on parity spaces.

== Editions ==
According to the Windows Server 2012 R2 datasheet published on May 31, 2013, there are four editions of this operating system: Foundation, Essentials, Standard and Datacenter. As with Windows Server 2012, the Datacenter and Standard editions are feature-identical, varying only based on licensing (particularly licensing of virtual instances). The Essentials edition has the same features as the Datacenter and Standard products, with some restrictions.

== Support lifecycle ==
Microsoft originally planned to end mainstream support for Windows Server 2012 and Windows Server 2012 R2 on January 9, 2018, with extended support ending on January 10, 2023. In order to provide customers the standard transition lifecycle timeline, Microsoft extended Windows Server 2012 and 2012 R2 support in March 2017 by 9 months. Windows Server 2012 reached the end of mainstream support on October 9, 2018 and entered the extended support phase, which ended on October 10, 2023.

Microsoft announced in July 2021 that they will distribute paid Extended Security Updates for volume licensed editions of Windows Server 2012 and Windows Server 2012 R2 for up to 3 years after the end of extended support. The Extended Security Updates program for Windows Server 2012 R2 ended on October 13, 2026, marking the final end of all security updates for the Windows NT 6.3 product line after 13 years, 1 month and 16 days.

== See also ==
- Microsoft Servers
- Comparison of Microsoft Windows versions
- History of Microsoft Windows
- Comparison of operating systems
- List of operating systems
