= Windows Server 2008 =

Version of Windows Server, released in 2008

- Version of the Windows NT operating system

- Screenshot of Windows Server 2008 showing the Server Manager application which is automatically opened when an administrator logs on
- Developer: Microsoft
- OS family: Windows Server
- Working state: No longer supported
- Source model: Closed-source; Source-available (through Shared Source Initiative)
- Released to manufacturing: February 4, 2008; 18 years ago
- General availability: February 27, 2008; 18 years ago
- Latest release: Service Pack 2 with January 2026 monthly update rollup (6.0.6003.23717) / January 13, 2026; 9 months ago
- Marketing target: Business
- Update method: Windows Update, Windows Server Update Services, SCCM
- Supported platforms: IA-32, x86-64, Itanium
- Kernel type: Hybrid (Windows NT kernel)
- Default user interface: Windows shell (Graphical)
- License: Proprietary commercial software
- Preceded by: Windows Server 2003 (2003)
- Succeeded by: Windows Server 2008 R2 (2009)
- Official website: Windows Server 2008 (archived at Wayback Machine)

Support status
- Mainstream support ended on January 13, 2015; Extended support ended on January 14, 2020 Paid updates; only for Standard, Enterprise, and Datacenter volume licensed editions: ESU (Extended Security Updates) support ended on January 10, 2023, for non-Azure & January 9, 2024, for Azure. Grandfathered Premium Assurance security update support ended on January 13, 2026. See § Paid extended updates for details.

Windows Server 2008, codenamed "Longhorn Server" is the seventh major version of the Windows NT operating system produced by Microsoft to be released under the Windows Server brand name. It was released to manufacturing on February 4, 2008, and generally to retail on February 27, 2008. Derived from Windows Vista, Windows Server 2008 is the successor to Windows Server 2003 R2 and the predecessor to Windows Server 2008 R2. It removed support for computers without ACPI, and is the first version that includes Hyper-V.

It is the last version of Windows Server that supports 32-bit processors (IA-32).

As of July 2019, 60% of Windows Servers were running Windows Server 2008.

== History ==
Microsoft had released Windows Vista to mixed reception, and their last Windows Server release was based on Windows XP. The operating system's working title was Windows Server Codename "Longhorn", but was later changed to Windows Server 2008 when Microsoft chairman Bill Gates announced it during his keynote address at WinHEC on May 16, 2007.

Beta 1 was released on July 27, 2005; Beta 2 was announced and released on May 23, 2006, at WinHEC 2006 and Beta 3 was released publicly on April 25, 2007. Release Candidate 0 was released to the general public on September 24, 2007 and Release Candidate 1 was released to the general public on December 5, 2007. Windows Server 2008 was released to manufacturing on February 4, 2008, and officially launched on the 27th of that month.

== Features ==
Windows Server 2008 is built from the same codebase as Windows Vista and thus it shares much of the same architecture and functionality. Since the codebase is common, Windows Server 2008 inherits most of the technical, security, management and administrative features new to Windows Vista such as the rewritten networking stack (native IPv6, native wireless, speed and security improvements); improved image-based installation, deployment and recovery; improved diagnostics, monitoring, event logging and reporting tools; new security features such as BitLocker and address space layout randomization (ASLR); the improved Windows Firewall with secure default configuration; .NET Framework 3.0 technologies, specifically Windows Communication Foundation, Microsoft Message Queuing and Windows Workflow Foundation; and the core kernel, memory and file system improvements. Processors and memory devices are modeled as Plug and Play devices to allow hot-plugging of these devices. This allows the system resources to be partitioned dynamically using dynamic hardware partitioning – each partition has its own memory, processor and I/O host bridge devices independent of other partitions.

=== Server Core ===
Default user interface for Server Core. Because Server Core does not include a shell, programs such as Notepad use an embedded file dialog inherited from Windows 3.x/Windows NT 3.1.

Windows Server 2008 includes a variation of installation called Server Core. Server Core is a significantly scaled-back installation where no Windows Explorer shell is installed. It also lacks Internet Explorer, and many other non-essential features. All configuration and maintenance is done entirely through command-line interface windows, or by connecting to the machine remotely using Microsoft Management Console (MMC). Notepad and some Control Panel applets, such as Regional Settings, are available.

A Server Core installation can be configured for several basic roles, including the domain controller (Active Directory Domain Services), Active Directory Lightweight Directory Services (formerly known as Active Directory Application Mode), DNS Server, DHCP server, file server, print server, Windows Media Server, Internet Information Services 7 web server and Hyper-V virtual server roles. Server Core can also be used to create a cluster with high availability using failover clustering or network load balancing.

Andrew Mason, a program manager on the Windows Server team, noted that a primary motivation for producing a Server Core variant of Windows Server 2008 was to reduce the attack surface of the operating system, and that about 70% of the security vulnerabilities in Microsoft Windows from the prior five years would not have affected Server Core.

=== Active Directory ===
The Active Directory domain functionality that was retained from Windows Server 2003 was renamed to Active Directory Domain Services (ADDS).

- Active Directory Federation Services (ADFS) enables enterprises to share credentials with trusted partners and customers, allowing a consultant to use their company user name and password to log in on a client's network.
- Active Directory Lightweight Directory Services (AD LDS), (formerly Active Directory Application Mode, or ADAM)
- Active Directory Certificate Services (ADCS) allow administrators to manage user accounts and the digital certificates that allow them to access certain services and systems. Identity Integration Feature Pack is included as Active Directory Metadirectory Services.
- Active Directory Rights Management Services (ADRMS)
- Read-only domain controllers (RODCs), intended for use in branch office or other scenarios where a domain controller may reside in a low physical security environment. The RODC holds a non-writeable copy of Active Directory, and redirects all write attempts to a full domain controller. It replicates all accounts except sensitive ones. In RODC mode, credentials are not cached by default. Also, local administrators can be designated to log on to the machine to perform maintenance tasks without requiring administrative rights on the entire domain.
- Restartable Active Directory allows ADDS to be stopped and restarted from the Management Console or the command-line without rebooting the domain controller. This reduces downtime for offline operations and reduces overall DC servicing requirements with Server Core. ADDS is implemented as a Domain Controller Service in Windows Server 2008.
- All of the Group Policy improvements from Windows Vista are included. Group Policy Management Console (GPMC) is built-in. The Group Policy objects are indexed for search and can be commented on.
- Policy-based networking with Network Access Protection, improved branch management and enhanced end user collaboration. Policies can be created to ensure greater quality of service for certain applications or services that require prioritization of network bandwidth between client and server.
- Granular password settings within a single domain – ability to implement different password policies for administrative accounts on a "group" and "user" basis, instead of a single set of password settings to the whole domain.

=== Failover Clustering ===
Windows Server 2008 offers high availability to services and applications through Failover Clustering. Most server features and roles can be kept running with little to no downtime.

In Windows Server 2008, the way clusters are qualified changed significantly with the introduction of the cluster validation wizard. The cluster validation wizard is a feature that is integrated into failover clustering in Windows Server 2008. With the cluster validation wizard, an administrator can run a set of focused tests on a collection of servers that are intended to use as nodes in a cluster. This cluster validation process tests the underlying hardware and software directly, and individually, to obtain an accurate assessment of how well failover clustering can be supported on a given configuration.

This feature is only available in Enterprise and Datacenter editions of Windows Server.

=== Disk management and file storage ===
- The ability to resize hard disk partitions without stopping the server, even the system partition. This applies only to simple and spanned volumes, not to striped volumes.
- Shadow Copy based block-level backup which supports optical media, network shares and Windows Recovery Environment.
- DFS enhancements – SYSVOL on DFS-R, Read-only Folder Replication Member. There is also support for domain-based DFS namespaces that exceed the previous size recommendation of 5,000 folders with targets in a namespace.
- Several improvements to Failover Clustering (high-availability clusters).
- Internet Storage Name Service (iSNS) enables central registration, deregistration and queries for iSCSI hard drives.
- Self-healing NTFS: In Windows versions prior to Windows Vista, if the operating system detected corruption in the file system of an NTFS volume, it marked the volume "dirty"; to correct errors on the volume, it had to be taken offline. With self-healing NTFS, an NTFS worker thread is spawned in the background which performs a localized fix-up of damaged data structures, with only the corrupted files/folders remaining unavailable without locking out the entire volume and needing the server to be taken down. S.M.A.R.T. detection techniques were added to help determine when a hard disk may fail.

=== Hyper-V ===
Hyper-V architecture

Hyper-V is hypervisor-based virtualization software, forming a core part of Microsoft's virtualization strategy. It virtualizes servers on an operating system's kernel layer. It can be thought of as partitioning a single physical server into multiple small computational partitions. Hyper-V includes the ability to act as a Xen virtualization hypervisor host allowing Xen-enabled guest operating systems to run virtualized. A beta version of Hyper-V shipped with certain x86-64 editions of Windows Server 2008, prior to Microsoft's release of the final version of Hyper-V on June 26, 2008 as a free download. Also, a standalone variant of Hyper-V exists; this variant supports only x86-64 architecture. While the IA-32 editions of Windows Server 2008 cannot run or install Hyper-V, they can run the MMC snap-in for managing Hyper-V.

=== Windows System Resource Manager ===
Windows System Resource Manager (WSRM) is integrated into Windows Server 2008. It provides resource management and can be used to control the amount of resources a process or a user can use based on business priorities. Process Matching Criteria, which is defined by the name, type or owner of the process, enforces restrictions on the resource usage by a process that matches the criteria. CPU time, bandwidth that it can use, number of processors it can be run on, and allocated to a process can be restricted. Restrictions can be set to be imposed only on certain dates as well.

=== Server Manager ===
Server Manager is a new roles-based management tool for Windows Server 2008. It is a combination of Manage Your Server and Security Configuration Wizard from Windows Server 2003. Server Manager is an improvement of the Configure my server dialog that launches by default on Windows Server 2003 machines. However, rather than serve only as a starting point to configuring new roles, Server Manager gathers together all of the operations users would want to conduct on the server, such as, getting a remote deployment method set up, adding more server roles etc., and provides a consolidated, portal-like view about the status of each role.

=== Protocol and cryptography ===
- Support for 128- and 256-bit AES encryption for the Kerberos authentication protocol.
- New cryptography (CNG) API which supports elliptic-curve cryptography and improved certificate management.
- Secure Socket Tunneling Protocol, a new Microsoft proprietary VPN protocol.
- AuthIP, a Microsoft proprietary extension of the IKE cryptographic protocol used in IPsec VPN networks.
- Server Message Block 2.0 protocol in the new TCP/IP stack provides a number of communication enhancements, including greater performance when connecting to file shares over high-latency links and better security through the use of mutual authentication and message signing.

=== Miscellaneous ===
- Fully componentized operating system.
- Improved hot patching, a feature that allows non-kernel patches to occur without the need for a reboot.
- Support for being booted from Extensible Firmware Interface (EFI)-compliant firmware on x86-64 systems.
- Dynamic Hardware Partitioning supports hot-addition or replacement of processors and memory, on capable hardware.
- Windows Deployment Services (WDS) replacing Automated Deployment Services Windows Server 2008 home entertainment and Remote Installation Services. Windows Deployment Services supports an enhanced multicast feature when deploying operating system images.
- Internet Information Services 7 – Increased security, Robocopy deployment, improved diagnostic tools, delegated administration.
- Windows Internal Database, a variant of SQL Server Express 2005, which serves as a common storage back-end for several other components such as Windows System Resource Manager, Windows SharePoint Services and Windows Server Update Services. It is not intended to be used by third-party applications.
- An optional "desktop experience" component provides the same Windows Aero user interface as Windows Vista, both for local users, as well as remote users connecting through Remote Desktop.

== Removed features ==
- The Open Shortest Path First (OSPF) routing protocol component in Routing and Remote Access Service was removed.
- Services for Macintosh, which provided file and print sharing via the now deprecated AppleTalk protocol, has been removed. Services for Macintosh were initially removed in Windows XP but were available in Windows Server 2003.
- NTBackup is replaced by Windows Server Backup, and no longer supports backing up to tape drives. As a result of NTBackup removal, Exchange Server 2007 does not have volume snapshot backup functionality; however Exchange Server 2007 SP2 adds back an Exchange backup plug-in for Windows Server Backup which restores partial functionality. Windows Small Business Server and Windows Essential Business Server both include this Exchange backup component.
- The POP3 service has been removed from Internet Information Services 7.0. The SMTP (Simple Mail Transfer Protocol) service is not available as a server role in IIS 7.0, it is a server feature managed through IIS 6.0.
- NNTP (Network News Transfer Protocol) is no longer part of Internet Information Services 7.0.
- ReadyBoost, which is available in Windows Vista, is not supported in Windows Server 2008.

== Editions ==
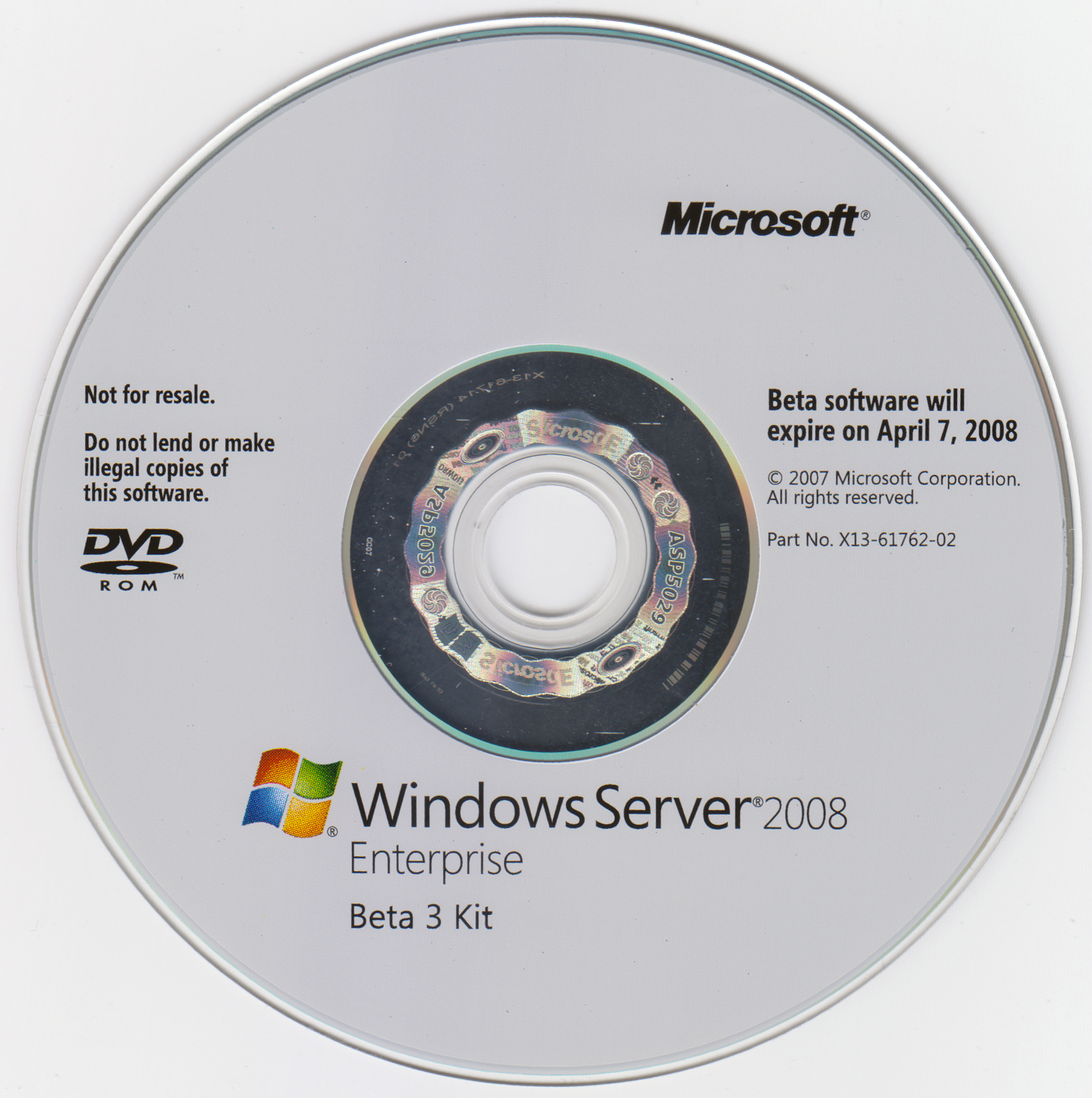
Installation disc of Enterprise edition (beta 3)

Most editions of Windows Server 2008 are available in x86-64 and IA-32 variants. These editions come in two DVDs: One for installing the IA-32 variant and the other for x64. Windows Server 2008 for Itanium-based Systems supports IA-64 processors. The IA-64 variant is optimized for high-workload scenarios like database servers and Line of Business (LOB) applications. As such, it is not optimized for use as a file server or media server. Windows Server 2008 is the last 32-bit Windows server operating system. Editions of Windows Server 2008 include:

- Windows Server 2008 Foundation (codenamed "Lima"; x86-64) for OEMs only
- Windows Server 2008 Standard (IA-32 and x86-64)
- Windows Server 2008 Enterprise (IA-32 and x86-64)
- Windows Server 2008 Datacenter (IA-32 and x86-64)
- Windows Server 2008 for Itanium-based Systems (IA-64)
- Windows Web Server 2008 (IA-32 and x86-64)
- Windows HPC Server 2008 (codenamed "Socrates"; replacing Windows Compute Cluster Server)
- Windows Storage Server 2008 (codenamed "Magni"; IA-32 and x86-64)
- Windows Small Business Server 2008 (codenamed "Cougar"; x86-64) for small businesses
- Windows Essential Business Server 2008 (codenamed "Centro"; x86-64) for medium-sized businesses – this edition was discontinued in 2010.

The Microsoft Imagine program, known as DreamSpark at the time, used to provide verified students with the 32-bit variant of Windows Server 2008 Standard Edition, but the version has since then been removed. However, they still provide the R2 release.

The Server Core feature is available in the Web, Standard, Enterprise and Datacenter editions.

Windows Server 2008 Foundation Released on May 21, 2009.

== System requirements ==
System requirements for Windows Server 2008 are as follows:

Criteria	2008		2008 R2	
Criteria	Minimum	Recommended	Minimum	Recommended
CPU	1 GHz (IA-32); 1.4 GHz (x86-64 or Itanium)	2 GHz or faster	1.4 GHz (x86-64 or Itanium)	2 GHz or faster
RAM	512 MB	2 GB or greater	512 MB	2 GB or greater
HDD (Note: Computers with more than 16 GB of RAM require more disk space for paging, hibernation, and dump files)	Other editions, 32-bit: 20 GB; Other editions, 64-bit: 32 GB; Foundation: 10 GB	40 GB or greater	Foundation: 10 GB; Other editions: 32 GB	Foundation: 10 GB or greater; Other editions: 32 GB or greater
Devices	DVD drive, 800 × 600 or higher display, keyboard and mouse			

== Scalability ==
Windows Server 2008 supports the following maximum hardware specifications:

Specification	Windows Server 2008	Windows Server 2008 R2
Physical processors ("sockets")	Standard: 4; Enterprise: 8; Datacenter: 32	Standard: 4; Enterprise: 8; Datacenter: 64
Logical processors when Hyper-V is disabled	IA-32: 32; x64: 64	256
Logical processors when Hyper-V is enabled	IA-32: N/A; x64: 24	64
Memory on IA-32	Standard, Web: 4 GB; Enterprise, Datacenter: 64 GB	—N/a
Memory on x64	Standard, Web: 32 GB; HPC: 128 GB; Enterprise, Datacenter: 1 TB	Foundation: 8 GB; Standard, Web: 32 GB; HPC: 128 GB; Enterprise, Datacenter: 2 TB
Memory on Itanium	2 TB	

== Updates ==
Windows Server 2008 shares most of its updates with Windows Vista, given that the operating systems share a codebase. A workaround using the Microsoft Update Catalog allowed the installation of updates for Windows Server 2008 on Windows Vista, adding nearly 3 years of security updates to that operating system (Support for Windows Vista ended on April 11, 2017, while support for Windows Server 2008 ended on January 14, 2020).

=== Service Pack 2 ===
The RTM release of Windows Server 2008 already includes the updates and fixes of Windows Vista Service Pack 1.

Service Pack 2 was initially announced on October 24, 2008 and released on May 26, 2009. Service Pack 2 added new features, such as Windows Search 4.0, support for Bluetooth 2.1, the ability to write to Blu-ray discs, and simpler Wi-Fi configuration. Windows Server 2008 specifically received the final release of Hyper-V 1.0, improved backwards compatibility with Terminal Server license keys and an approximate 10% reduction in power usage with this service pack.

Windows Vista and Windows Server 2008 share the same service pack update binary.

=== Platform Update ===
On October 27, 2009, Microsoft released the Platform Update for Windows Server 2008 and Windows Vista. It backports several APIs and libraries introduced in Windows Server 2008 R2 and Windows 7 to Windows Server 2008 and Windows Vista, including the Ribbon API, DirectX 11, the XPS library, the Windows Automation API and the Portable Device Platform. A supplemental update was released in 2011 to provide improvements and bug fixes.

=== Internet Explorer 9 ===
Windows Server 2008 shipped with Internet Explorer 7, the same version that shipped with Windows Vista. The last version of Internet Explorer for Windows Server 2008 was Internet Explorer 9, released on March 14, 2011. Internet Explorer 9 was continually updated with cumulative monthly update rollups until support for Internet Explorer 9 on Windows Server 2008 ended on January 14, 2020. IE9 continued to receive updates as long as the operating system was with Extended Security Updates until January 10, 2023 for non-Azure customers and January 9, 2024 for Azure customers respectively and January 2026 for Premium Assurance customers.

=== .NET Framework ===
The latest supported version of the .NET Framework officially is version 4.6, released on July 20, 2015.

=== TLS 1.1 and 1.2 support ===
In July 2017, Microsoft released an update to add TLS 1.1 and 1.2 support to Windows Server 2008, however it is disabled by default after installing the update.

=== SHA-2 signing support ===
Starting in March 2019, Microsoft began transitioning to exclusively signing Windows updates with the SHA-2 algorithm. As a result of this Microsoft released several updates throughout 2019 to add SHA-2 signing support to Windows Server 2008.

=== Monthly update rollups ===
In June 2018, Microsoft announced that they would be moving Windows Server 2008 to a monthly update model beginning with updates released in September 2018 – two years after Microsoft switched the rest of their supported operating systems to that model.

With the new update model, instead of updates being released as they became available, only two update packages were released on the second Tuesday of every month until Windows Server 2008 reached its end of life – one package containing security and quality updates, and a smaller package that contained only the security updates. Users could choose which package they wanted to install each month. Later in the month, another package would be released which was a preview of the next month's security and quality update rollup.

Installing the preview rollup package released for Windows Server 2008 on March 19, 2019, or any later released rollup package, will update the operating system kernel's build number from version 6.0.6002 to 6.0.6003. This change was made so Microsoft could continue to service the operating system while avoiding "version-related issues".

The last free security update rollup packages were released on January 14, 2020.

== Windows Server 2008 R2 ==
A second release of Windows Server 2008 (codenamed: Windows Server 7) based on Windows 7, Windows Server 2008 R2, was released to manufacturing on July 22, 2009 and became generally available on October 22, 2009. New features added in Windows Server 2008 R2 include new virtualization features, new Active Directory features, Internet Information Services 7.5 and support for up to 256 logical processors. It is the first server operating system by Microsoft to exclusively support 64-bit processors, while consumer-oriented versions of Windows maintained 32-bit support until Windows 11 in 2021. It is also the final version of Windows Server that supports IA-64-based processors.

A service pack for Windows 7 and Windows Server 2008 R2, formally designed Service Pack 1, was released in February 2011.

== Support lifecycle ==
Support for the RTM version of Windows Server 2008 ended on July 12, 2011, and users can no longer receive further security updates for the operating system. As a component of Windows Vista, Windows Server 2008 with Service Pack 2 continued to be supported with security updates, lasting until January 14, 2020, the same respective end-of-life dates of its successor, Windows Server 2008 R2 and Windows 7.

Microsoft planned to end support for Windows Server 2008 on January 12, 2016. However, in order to give customers more time to migrate to newer Windows versions, particularly in developing or emerging markets, Microsoft decided to extend support to January 14, 2020.

=== Paid extended updates ===
Windows Server 2008 was eligible for the paid Extended Security Updates (ESU) program. The program allowed volume license customers to purchase, in yearly installments, security updates for the operating system for three additional years, until January 10, 2023. The program was also included with Microsoft Azure purchases, and Azure customers received an extra year of support, until January 9, 2024. The licenses are paid for on a per-machine basis. If a user purchases an Extended Security Updates license in a later year of the program, they must pay for any previous years of Extended Security Updates as well.

Prior to the ESU program becoming available, Windows Server 2008 was eligible for the now discontinued, paid Premium Assurance program (an add-on to Microsoft Software Assurance) available to volume license customers. However, Microsoft honored the program for customers who purchased it between March 2017 and July 2018 (while it was available). The program provided an extra six years of security update support. The Extended Security Updates program for Windows Server 2008 ended on January 13, 2026, marking the final end of all security updates for the Windows NT 6.0 product line after 19 years, 2 months, and 5 days.

Paid extended updates were not available for Itanium customers.

== See also ==
- BlueKeep (security vulnerability)
- Comparison of Microsoft Windows versions
- Comparison of operating systems
- Microsoft Windows version history
- List of operating systems
- Microsoft Servers
