= Windows Internal Database =

Windows Internal Database (codenamed WYukon, sometimes referred to as SQL Server Embedded Edition) is a variant of SQL Server Express 2005–2014 that is included with Windows Server 2008 (SQL 2005), Windows Server 2008 R2 (SQL 2005), Windows Server 2012 (SQL 2012), Windows Server 2012 R2 (SQL 2012), Windows Server 2016, Windows Server 2019 and Windows Server 2022 (SQL 2014) and is included with other free Microsoft products released after 2007 that require an SQL Server database backend. Windows SharePoint Services 3.0 and Windows Server Update Services 3.0 both include Windows Internal Database, which can be used as an alternative to using a retail edition of SQL Server. WID was a 32-bit application, even as a component of Windows Server 2008 64-bit, which installs in the path C:\Windows\sysmsi\ssee\ In Windows Server 2012 and later, it is a 64-bit application, installed in C:\Windows\WID.

Windows Internal Database is not available as a standalone product for use by end-user applications; Microsoft provides SQL Server Express and Microsoft SQL Server for this purpose. Additionally, it is designed to only be accessible to Windows Services running on the same machine.

Several components of Windows Server 2008 and 2012 use Windows Internal Database for their data storage: Active Directory Rights Management Services, Windows System Resource Manager, UDDI Services, Active Directory Federation Services 2.0, Remote Desktop (standalone) Connection Broker, IPAM and Windows SharePoint Services. On Windows Server 2003, SharePoint and Windows Server Update Services will install Windows Internal Database and use it as a default data store if a retail SQL Server database instance is not provided. A Knowledge Base article published by Microsoft states that Windows Internal Database does not identify itself as a removable component, and provides instructions how it may be uninstalled by calling Windows Installer directly.

SQL Server Management Studio Express can be used to connect to an instance of Windows Internal Database using \\.\pipe\MSSQL$MICROSOFT##SSEE\sql\query (2003–2008) or \\.\pipe\MICROSOFT##WID\tsql\query (2012) as instance name. But this will only work locally, as Remote Connections cannot be enabled for this edition of SQL Server. Also note that "Windows Authentication" should be used (as opposed to SQL Server Authentication), and administrators seem to have the best results of authenticating successfully when logged on using the same administrative account that was created when Windows was installed.
