= Microsoft Remote Web Workplace =

Remote Web Workplace Home Page for SBS 2003

The Remote Web Workplace is a feature of Microsoft's Windows Small Business Server, Windows Home Server 2011, and the midsize business-focused product, Windows Essential Business Server, which enables existing users to log into a front-end network-facing interface of the small business/home server.

After logging into Remote Web Workplace (using their usual Windows domain username and password) a user can access enabled features of the Small Business Server or Essential Business Server such as Outlook Web App, viewing of SharePoint pages and (if a machine is running and allows it) full remote control of client machines connected to server's network.

== Offsite access ==
Remote Web Workplace is a feature of Windows Small Business Server, Windows Home Server 2011, and Windows Essential Business Server that allows access for users to facilities when they are offsite such as email, reading/modifying shared calendars and remote controlling a machine as if they are sitting in front of it.

== Connection options ==
When logging into Remote Web Workplace, users can select the speed of their connection which then optimizes the connection features. Options are: Small Business Network (Intranet), Broadband, 56 kbit/s modem and 28 kbit/s Modem.

== Means of access ==
The Remote Web Workplace is a Web-based application and is accessed through a web browser. To control remote computers, the user is required to install a "Remote Desktop ActiveX control" into their web browser once. Only Internet Explorer is supported.

RWW works by proxying Remote Desktop via port 4125/tcp on earlier versions of SBS and via port 443/tcp on current versions of SBS to the usual RDP port (3389/tcp) on the internal client or server machine being reached. As a security measure, port 4125/tcp and/or port 443/tcp is not normally listening for incoming connections. The RDP Gateway service will only accept connections from the IP address of the user who has requested a RDP session via the web GUI. All other connection requests will be ignored producing "Connection refused" errors. The established proxied RDP session continues until the session inactivity timer drops the connection or the user disconnects. The usual RDP port of 3389/tcp is never exposed to the internet for RDP sessions established with RWW.
