= Microsoft Update Catalog =

Update services website by Microsoft

- Website type: Downloads
- Available in: English
- Owner: Microsoft
- Creator: Microsoft
- Website: Microsoft Update Catalog
- Commercial: No
- Current status: Active
- Content license: Microsoft Software Licensing and Protection Services

The Microsoft Update Catalog is a website created by Microsoft that provides a list of patches, drivers and software for corporations to distribute over a network.

== Scope ==
Security updates are released once a month on the website, except in special circumstances; for instance, in the event of a widespread computer virus or worm, Microsoft releases a corresponding update as soon as possible.

Gordon Mangione, Microsoft's Security Business & Technology Unit vice president (from 2004-03 to 2005-11), remarked:

"Because the new services and technologies draw information and updates from a single source—the Microsoft Update catalog—and use a common polling engine (provided by the new Windows Update Agent), our customers will have a much more integrated and reliable update management process."

== Usage ==
The latest iteration of the site was launched in August 2007, and at the time, only worked in the web browser Internet Explorer, version 6 and version 7. Before using the catalog, the user must install an ActiveX control so that they can search the updates available on the website. Searches can be saved as an RSS feed so that it can be monitored for new updates. On the Microsoft Update Catalog, downloads are accelerated with Microsoft's Background Intelligent Transfer Service, which downloads updates from the website asynchronously while attempting to use as little bandwidth as possible.

In addition, the service integrates with Windows Server Update Services and System Center Configuration Manager 2007 so that network administrators can deploy updates downloaded from the website remotely across a network.

A third-party tool named Legacy Update allows previously released updates for Windows 2000 and Windows XP to be installed from the Update Catalog.

== Resurgence ==
As of late 2015, and the release of Windows 10, Microsoft has been making updates available exclusively through Microsoft Update Catalog. The website no longer requires an ActiveX control and can be used from any modern browser rather than being exclusive to Internet Explorer. This allows users on other platforms to download updates for archive or distribution.

== See also ==
- Windows Server Update Services (WSUS)
- Windows Update
- Microsoft
