= IP-HTTPS =

Microsoft network tunneling protocol

IP over HTTPS ("IP-HTTPS", "MS-IPHTTPS") is a Microsoft network tunneling protocol. The IP-HTTPS protocol transports IPv6 packets across non-IPv6 networks. It does a similar job as the earlier 6to4 or Teredo tunneling mechanisms.

== Microsoft preference when deciding between transition protocols ==
Microsoft used to discourage IP-HTTPS use because it was slow.

For Windows Server 2012, Microsoft changed the internal workings of the protocol, and IP-HTTPS is now the "preferred IPv6 transition technology" for their DirectAccess VPN technology.
