= Microsoft Exchange Hosted Services =

FrontBridge Technologies
- Formerly: Bigfish Communications (2000–?)
- Company type: Subsidiary
- Industry: Email security
- Founded: 2000
- Fate: Acquired by Microsoft
- Headquarters: Marina del Rey, California, U.S.
- Products: Microsoft Exchange Hosted Services
- Parent: Microsoft (2005–)

FrontBridge administrative dashboard, showing spam and malicious email filtering rates (99.54% of all messages for these domains)

Microsoft Exchange Hosted Services, also known as FrontBridge, is an email filtering system owned by Microsoft. It was acquired in 2005 from Frontbridge Inc.

FrontBridge Technologies began in 2000 as Bigfish Communications in Marina del Rey, California. The service is sold directly and through partnership with Sprint Nextel. On 30 March 2006, Microsoft announced new branding, a new licensing model and the road map for Microsoft Exchange Hosted Services, formerly known as FrontBridge Technologies Inc. With the announcement, four new products were introduced.

== See also ==
- Microsoft Forefront Online Protection for Exchange
- Hosted desktop
