= Microsoft Forefront =

Line-of-business security software by Microsoft Corporation

Microsoft Forefront logo

Microsoft Forefront is a discontinued family of line-of-business security software by Microsoft Corporation. Microsoft Forefront products are designed to help protect computer networks, network servers (such as Microsoft Exchange Server and Microsoft SharePoint Server) and individual devices. As of 2015, the only actively developed Forefront product is Forefront Identity Manager.

== Components ==
Forefront includes the following products:

- Identity Manager: State-based identity management software product, designed to manage users' digital identities, credentials and groupings throughout the lifecycle of their membership of an enterprise computer system

=== Rebranded ===
- System Center Endpoint Protection: A business antivirus software product that can be controlled over the network, formerly known as Forefront Endpoint Protection, Forefront Client Security and Client Protection.
- Exchange Online Protection: A software as a service version of Forefront Protect for Exchange Server: Instead of installing a security program on the server, the customer re-routes its email traffic to the Microsoft online service before receiving them.

=== Discontinued ===
- Threat Management Gateway: Discontinued server product that provides three functions: Routing, firewall and web cache. Formerly called Internet Security and Acceleration Server or ISA Server.

- Unified Access Gateway: Discontinued server product that protects network assets by encrypting all inbound access request from authorized users. Supports Virtual Private Networks (VPN) and DirectAccess. Formerly called Intelligent Application Gateway.
- Server Management Console: Discontinued web-based application that enables management of multiple instances of Protection for Exchange, Protection for SharePoint and Microsoft Antigen from a single interface.

- Protection for Exchange: A discontinued software product that detects viruses, spyware, and spam by integrating multiple scanning engines from security partners in a single solution to protect Exchange messaging environments. FPE provides an administration console that includes customizable configuration settings, filtering options, monitoring features and reports, and integration with the Forefront Online Protection for Exchange (FOPE) product. After installation, managing FPE on multiple Exchange servers can be done with the Protection Server Management Console. Additionally, FPE can be managed using Windows PowerShell, a command-line shell and task-based scripting technology that enables the automation of system administration tasks.

- Protection for SharePoint: A discontinued product that protects Microsoft SharePoint Server document libraries. It enforces rules that prevent documents containing malware, sensitive information, or out-of-policy content from being uploaded. Protection Server Management Console or Windows PowerShell can be used to manage Protection for SharePoint Server on multiple servers.
- Security for Office Communications Server: Protects computers running Microsoft Office Communications Server from malware. Formerly called Antigen for Instant Messaging.

== History ==
The predecessor to the Forefront server protection products was the Antigen line of antivirus products created by Sybari Software. Sybari was acquired by Microsoft in 2005, and the first Microsoft-branded version of the product was called Microsoft Forefront Security for SharePoint (FSSP) Version 10. FSSP Version 10 supports Microsoft Office SharePoint Server 2007 or Microsoft Windows SharePoint Services version 3, whereas FPSP (the last version of the product) supports Microsoft Office SharePoint Server 2010, Microsoft SharePoint Foundation 2010, Microsoft Office SharePoint Server 2007 SP1, or Windows SharePoint Services version 3 SP1.

== See also ==
- Microsoft Servers
