= Exchange Online Protection =

Hosted e-mail security service, owned by Microsoft

Exchange Online Protection (EOP, formerly Forefront Online Protection for Exchange or FOPE) is a hosted e-mail security service, owned by Microsoft, that filters spam and removes computer viruses from e-mail messages. The service does not require client software installation, but is activated by changing each customer's MX record. Each customer pays for the service by means of a subscription.

Most administrative tasks are performed through the use of a web-based administrative console. The console allows customers to perform management tasks, such as adding users and configuring filtering.

EOP is a part of the Exchange Online family of products.

== History ==
Microsoft Forefront Online Protection for Exchange was originally created by FrontBridge Technologies. Microsoft acquired FrontBridge Technologies Inc. in 2005, and it became a subsidiary of Microsoft.

In 2006, Microsoft announced new branding as Microsoft Exchange Hosted Services (EHS), formerly known as FrontBridge Technologies Inc.

On April 29, 2009, the service was renamed to Forefront Online Security for Exchange.

Forefront Online Security for Exchange (FOSE) version 9.1 was released on June 9, 2009.

On November 17, 2009, Forefront Online Security for Exchange (FOSE) was rebranded as Forefront Online Protection for Exchange (FOPE). An update to version 9.3 of Forefront Online Protection for Exchange, was also released on this date.

On March 1, 2013, Microsoft launched Exchange Online Protection (EOP). The transition from FOPE to EOP is expected to complete in the first half of 2014.
