= Information rights management =

Information rights management (IRM) is a subset of digital rights management (DRM), technologies that protect sensitive information from unauthorized access. It is sometimes referred to as E-DRM or Enterprise Digital Rights Management. This can cause confusion, because digital rights management (DRM) technologies are typically associated with business-to-consumer systems designed to protect rich media such as music and video. IRM is a technology which allows for information (mostly in the form of documents) to be ‘remote controlled’.

This means that information and its control can now be separately created, viewed, edited and distributed. A true IRM system is typically used to protect information in a business-to-business model, such as financial data, intellectual property and executive communications. IRM currently applies mainly to documents and emails.

== Features ==
IRM technologies typically have a number of features that allow an owner to control, manage and secure information from unwanted access.

=== Information encryption ===
Information rights management solutions use encryption to prevent unauthorized access. A key or password can be used to control access to the encrypted data.

=== Permissions management ===
Once a document is encrypted against unauthorized users, an IRM user can apply certain access permissions that permit or deny a user from taking certain actions on a piece of information. Some of these standard permissions are included below.

- Strong in use protection, such as controlling copy & paste, preventing screenshots, printing, editing.
- A rights model/policy which allows for easy mapping of business classifications to information.
- Offline use allowing for users to create/access IRM sealed documents without needing network access for certain periods of time.
- Full auditing of both access to documents as well as changes to the rights/policy by business users.

It also allows users to change or revoke access permissions without sharing the document again.

== Examples ==
An example of IRM in use would be to secure a sensitive engineering document being distributed in an environment where the document's recipients could not necessarily be trusted.

Alternatively, an e-mail could be secured with IRM. If an email is accidentally forwarded to an untrusted party, only authorized users can gain access. A well designed IRM system will not limit the ability for information to be shared. Rules are enforced only when people attempt to gain access. This is important as often people share sensitive information with users who should legitimately have access but don't. Technology must facilitate control over sensitive information in such a situation.

IRM is far more secure than shared secret passwords. Key management is used to protect the information whilst it is at rest on a hard disk, network drive or other storage device. IRM continues to protect and control access to the document when it is in use. Functionality such as preventing screen shots, disallowing the copying of data from the secure document to an insecure environment and guarding the information from programmatic attack, are key elements of an effective IRM solution.

== Naming conventions ==
Information rights management is also known by the following names:

- Enterprise Rights Management
- Enterprise DRM or Enterprise Digital Rights Management
- Document Rights Management
- Intelligent Rights Management

== See also ==
- Digital rights management
- Always-on DRM
- Copyright infringement
- Encryption
- Advanced Encryption Standard
- Rpmsg
