= Logparser =

logparser
- Stable release: 2.2.10 / 2005-04-20
- Operating system: Windows Server 2003
- Type: Tool
- License: Free

logparser is a flexible command line utility that was initially written by Gabriele Giuseppini, a Microsoft employee, to automate tests for IIS logging. It was intended for use with the Windows operating system, and was included with the IIS 6.0 Resource Kit Tools. The default behavior of logparser works like a "data processing pipeline", by taking an SQL expression on the command line, and outputting the lines containing matches for the SQL expression.

Logparser is a tool that provides universal query access to text-based data such as log files, XML files and CSV files, as well as key data sources on the Windows operating system such as the Event Log, the Registry, the file system, and Active Directory. The results of the input query can be custom-formatted in text based output, or they can be persisted to more specialty targets like SQL, SYSLOG, or a chart.

Common use:

> logparser <options> <SQL expression>

Example: Selecting date, time and client username accessing ASPX-files, taken from all .log-files in the current directory.

> logparser -i:IISW3C -q "SELECT date, time, cs-username FROM *.log WHERE cs-uri-stem LIKE '%.aspx' ORDER BY date, time;"
