= DirectAccess =

VPN intranet technology

DirectAccess, also known as Unified Remote Access, is a VPN technology that provides intranet connectivity to client computers when they are connected to the Internet. Unlike many traditional VPN connections, which must be initiated and terminated by explicit user action, DirectAccess connections are designed to connect automatically as soon as the computer connects to the Internet. DirectAccess was introduced in Windows Server 2008 R2, providing this service to Windows 7 and Windows 8 "Enterprise" edition clients. In 2010, Microsoft Forefront Unified Access Gateway (UAG) was released, which simplifies the deployment of DirectAccess for Windows 2008 R2, and includes additional components that make it easier to integrate without the need to deploy IPv6 on the network, and with a dedicated user interface for the configuration and monitoring. Some requirements and limitations that were part of the design of DirectAccess with Windows Server 2008 R2 and UAG have been changed (see requirements below). While DirectAccess is based on Microsoft technology, third-party solutions exist for accessing internal UNIX and Linux servers through DirectAccess. With Windows Server 2012, DirectAccess is fully integrated into the operating system, providing a user interface to configure and native IPv6 and IPv4 support.

== Technology ==
DirectAccess establishes IPsec tunnels from the client to the DirectAccess server, and uses IPv6 to reach intranet resources or other DirectAccess clients. This technology encapsulates the IPv6 traffic over IPv4 to be able to reach the intranet over the Internet, which still (mostly) relies on IPv4 traffic. All traffic to the intranet is encrypted using IPsec and encapsulated in IPv4 packets (if a native IPv6 connection cannot be established), which means that in most cases, no configuration of firewalls or proxies should be required. A DirectAccess client can use one of several tunneling technologies, depending on the configuration of the network the client is connected to. The client can use 6to4, Teredo tunneling, or IP-HTTPS, provided the server is configured correctly to be able to use them. For example, a client that is connected to the Internet directly will use 6to4, but if it is inside a NATed network, it will use Teredo instead. In addition, Windows Server 2012 provides two backward compatibility services DNS64 and NAT64, which allows DirectAccess clients to communicate with servers inside the corporate network even if those servers are only capable of IPv4 networking. Due to the globally routable nature of IPv6, computers on the corporate network can also initiate a connection to DirectAccess clients, which allows them to remotely manage (Manage Out) these clients at any time.

== Benefits ==
DirectAccess can be deployed for multiple sites. It allows for a secure encrypted VPN. This is controlled through Group Policies which allows the administrator to maintain a secure network.

== Requirements ==
DirectAccess With Windows Server 2008 R2 or UAG requires:

- One or more DirectAccess servers running Windows Server 2008 R2 with two network adapters: one that is connected directly to the Internet, and a second that is connected to the intranet.
- On the DirectAccess server, at least two consecutive, public IPv4 addresses assigned to the network adapter that is connected to the Internet.
- DirectAccess clients running Windows 7 "Ultimate" or "Enterprise" editions or Windows 8 "Enterprise" edition clients
- At least one domain controller and Domain Name System (DNS) server running Windows Server 2008 SP2 or Windows Server 2008 R2.
- Public key infrastructure (PKI) to issue computer certificates.

DirectAccess With Windows Server 2012 requires:

- One or more DirectAccess servers running Windows Server 2012 with one or more network adapters.
- At least one domain controller and Domain Name System (DNS) server running Windows Server 2008 SP2 or Windows Server 2008 R2.
- DirectAccess clients running Windows 7 "Ultimate" or "Enterprise" editions or Windows 8 "Enterprise" edition clients
- A Public Key Infrastructure is not required for Windows 8 Clients.

Smart card certificates, and health certificates for Network Access Protection may be used along with PKI.
