= Windows Activation Services =

Windows Process Activation Service
- Other names: WAS
- Operating system: Microsoft Windows
- Service name: Windows Process Activation Service (was)
- Website: technet.microsoft.com/en-us/library/cc770745.aspx

Windows Process Activation Service (also known as WAS) is the process activation mechanism introduced within Internet Information Services v7.0.

Windows Activation Service builds on the existing Internet Information Services v6.0 but is more powerful because it provides support for other protocols besides HTTP, such as TCP and Named Pipes. Windows Activation Service extends the ASP.NET HTTP hosting concept (ASMX Web Services). As a standalone Windows component, Windows Activation Service is completely separated from the IIS hosting environment and provides a protocol-agnostic activation mechanism not limited to HTTP.

Windows Activation Service allows the developers to choose the most appropriate protocol for their needs. For HTTP, data transfer relies on the ASP.NET HTTP. For protocols such as TCP and Named Pipes, Windows Activation Service leverages the extensibility points of ASP.NET for transferring data.

These capabilities are implemented in the form of protocol handlers, which manage communication between the worker process and the Windows service. There are two types of protocol handlers loaded when the WAS activates a worker process instance: Process Protocol Handler (PPH) and App Domain Protocol Handler (ADPH).
