= Microsoft Software Licensing and Protection Services =

Microsoft Software Licensing and Protection Services, also known as Microsoft SLPS, is a software licensing suite that provides developers with the ability to license software, create license versions, and track performance of products and profitability. SLPS is intended for developers and independent software vendors (ISV) streamline operations with .NET protection technology and a licensing server.

== History ==
Microsoft SLPS, formerly called SecureLM, was acquired by Microsoft in January 2007 from the company Secured Dimensions. Secured Dimensions was founded in 2005 by Avi Shillo in Israel. It was acquired by Microsoft soon after the CEO of Microsoft Israel, Arie Scope, joined its board of directors.

On June 9, 2009, Microsoft announced that a Dublin-based company called InishTech has acquired the product and would service existing contracts and accept new SLPS customers.

== Themes ==
=== Security ===
SLPS performs “private permutation” for each company by transforming managed (.NET) code into a secure virtual machine (SVM) language that is attached to the application, protecting it from manipulation by end users. This process is done using a toolkit called Code Protector. Application features can later be marked as licensable or modifiable entities. SLPS is .NET certified and works with the Visual Basic .NET platforms, C#, Java and web applications.

=== Licensing ===
In the Code Protector toolkit, developers can mark pieces of code as ‘licensable’ that can later be activated as bundles, SKUs, or packages where features can be turned on and off. Possible license models are time-based licenses, trial versions, user-based licenses, feature-based licenses and others depending on the business type.

=== Distribution ===
SLPS lets developers create and activate new digital licenses without having to ship a new product to the office. This removes the hassle of recompiling code or ordering a new product or SKU. All they need to do is create a new digital license and SLPS will unlock it and activate it.

=== Management ===
Developers and managers have access to real-time information about new licenses generated, license expiry times, and most popular packages. SLPS lets developers monitor billing, license usage, and software features usage. It can also be tied into a back-end billing system or customer relationship manager (CRM) to allow business partners to perform similar SLPS operations.

== Product models ==
InishTech SLPS is available in three different Editions: Standard, Professional and Enterprise.

Code Protector Software Development Kit
A tool kit that will allow software developers to protect their software from reverse engineering, a common form of piracy.
SLP Server
A server that will manage the licensing issues and product keys for software vendors.
SLP Online Service
A InishTech hosted solution for license management.

== See also ==
- License manager
- Product activation
- Floating licensing
