= Outlook on the web =

Microsoft's personal information manager web app

- Microsoft Outlook logo

- Outlook Mail inbox in Outlook on the web, running in Microsoft Edge
- Developer: Microsoft
- Release: May 23, 1997
- Written in: TypeScript (React)
- Type: Personal information manager (Webmail, calendaring, contacts, and tasks)
- License: Web version: Not licensed; On-premises: Trialware
- Website: microsoft.com/microsoft-365/outlook/web-email-login-for-outlook

Outlook on the web (formerly Outlook Web App and Outlook Web Access) is a personal information manager web app from Microsoft. It is a web-based version of Microsoft Outlook, and is included in Exchange Server and Exchange Online (a component of Microsoft 365).

It can be freely accessed from any web browser whether inside or outside an organization's network, and includes a web email client, a calendar tool, a contact manager, and a task manager. It also includes add-in integration, Skype on the web, and alerts as well as unified themes that span across all the web apps.

== Purpose ==
Outlook on the web is available to Microsoft 365 (formerly Office 365) and Exchange Online subscribers, and is included with the on-premises Exchange Server, to enable users to connect to their email accounts via a web browser, without requiring the installation of Microsoft Outlook or other email clients. In case of Exchange Server, it is hosted on a local intranet and requires a network connection to the Exchange Server for users to work with e-mail, address book, calendars and task. The Exchange Online version, which can be bought either independently or through Office 365 licensing program, is hosted on Microsoft servers on the World Wide Web.

== History ==
Outlook Web Access was created in 1995 by Microsoft Program Manager Thom McCann on the Exchange Server team. An early working version was demonstrated by Microsoft Vice President Paul Maritz at Microsoft's famous Internet summit in Seattle on December 27, 1995. The first customer version was shipped as part of the Exchange Server 5.0 release in early 1997.

The first component to allow client-side scripts to issue HTTP requests (XMLHTTP) was originally written by the Outlook Web Access team. It soon became a part of Internet Explorer 5. Renamed XMLHttpRequest and standardized by the World Wide Web Consortium, it has since become one of the cornerstones of the Ajax technology used to build advanced web apps.

Outlook Web Access was later renamed Outlook Web App in 2010. An update on August 4, 2015, renamed OWA to "Outlook on the web", often referred to in brief as simply "Outlook".

== Components ==
Mail function on Outlook Web App (2013)

=== Mail ===
Mail is the webmail component of Outlook on the web. The default view is a three column view with folders and groups on the left, an email message list in the middle, and the selected message on the right. With the 2015 update, Microsoft introduced the ability to pin, sweep and archive messages, and undo the last action, as well as richer image editing features. It can connect to other services such as GitHub and Twitter through Office 365 Connectors. Actionable Messages in emails allows a user to complete a task from within the email, such as retweeting a Tweet on Twitter or setting a meeting date on a calendar.

Outlook on the web supports S/MIME and includes features for managing calendars, contacts, tasks, documents (used with SharePoint or Office Web Apps), and other mailbox content. In the Exchange 2007 release, Outlook on the web (still called Outlook Web App at the time) also offers read-only access to documents stored in SharePoint sites and network UNC shares.

=== Calendar ===
Calendar is the calendaring component of Outlook on the web. With the update, Microsoft added a weather forecast directly in the Calendar, as well as icons (or "charms") as visual cues for an event. In addition, email reminders came to all events, and a special Birthday and Holiday event calendars are created automatically. Calendars can be shared and there are multiple views such as day, week, month, and today. Another view is work week which includes Mondays through Fridays in the calendar view. Calendar's "Board View" feature allows for a customizable calendar with widgets such as Goal, Calendar, Tasks and Tips.

Calendar details can be added with HTML and rich-text editing, and files can be attached to calendar events and appointments.

=== People ===
People is the contact manager component of Outlook on the web. A user can search and edit existing contacts, as well as create new ones. Contacts can be placed into folders and duplicate contacts can be linked from multiple sources such as LinkedIn or Twitter. In Outlook Mail, a contact can be created by clicking on an email address sender, which pulls down a contact card with an add button to add to Outlook People. Contacts can be imported as well as placed into a list that can be utilized when composing an email in Outlook Mail.

People can also sync with friends and connections lists on LinkedIn, Facebook, and Twitter.

=== To Do ===
To Do was originally launched as Tasks for Outlook Web App. Microsoft was slowly rolling out a preview of Tasks to its consumer-based Outlook.com service that in May 2015, was announced to be moving to the Office 365 infrastructure. It was initially a part of Calendar as a view. Microsoft has separated the services into its own web app in Outlook on the web. In a post on the Office Blogs in 2015, Microsoft announced that Outlook Web App would be renamed Outlook on the web and that Tasks would move under that brand. A user can create tasks, put them into categories, and move them to another folder. A feature added was the ability to set due days and sort and filter the tasks according to those criteria. The app provides the user with fields such as subject, start and end dates, percent complete, priority, and how much work was put into each task. Rich editing features like bold, italic, underline, numbering, and bullet points were also introduced. Tasks can be edited and categorized according to how the user wishes them to be sorted.

== Removed features ==
Outlook on the web has had two interfaces available: one with a complete feature set (known as Premium) and one with reduced functionality (known as Light or sometimes Lite). Prior to Exchange 2010, the Premium client required Internet Explorer. Exchange 2000 and 2003 require Internet Explorer 5 and later, and Exchange 2007 requires Internet Explorer 6 and later. Exchange 2010 supports a wider range of web browsers: Internet Explorer 7 or later, Firefox 3.01 or later, Chrome, or Safari 3.1 or later. However, Exchange 2010 restricts its Firefox and Safari support to macOS and Linux. In Exchange 2013, these browser restrictions were lifted.

In Exchange 2010 and earlier, the Light user interface is rendered for browsers other than Internet Explorer. The basic interface did not support search on Exchange Server 2003. In Exchange Server 2007, the Light interface supported searching mail items; managing contacts and the calendar was also improved. The 2010 version can connect to an external email account.

The ability to add new accounts to Outlook on the web using the Connected accounts feature was removed in September 2018 and all connected accounts stopped synchronizing email the following month.

== See also ==
- List of collaborative software
