= Microsoft mobile services =

Set of proprietary mobile services

Microsoft mobile services are a set of proprietary mobile services created specifically for mobile devices; they are typically offered through mobile applications and mobile browser for Windows Phone platforms, BREW, and Java. Microsoft's mobile services are typically connected with a Microsoft account and often come preinstalled on Microsoft's own mobile operating systems while they are offered via various means for other platforms. Microsoft started to develop for mobile computing platforms with the launch of Windows CE in 1996 and later added Microsoft's Pocket Office suite to their Handheld PC line of PDAs in April 2000. From December 2014 to June 2015, Microsoft made a number of corporate acquisitions, buying several of the top applications listed in Google Play and the App Store including Acompli, Sunrise Calendar, Datazen, Wunderlist, Echo Notification Lockscreen, and MileIQ.

Applications and web services
Mobile service	App	Web	SMS	Exchange ActiveSync	Description	Status
Calendar Mobile					Web-based version of Windows Live Calendar designed for mobile devices to view, schedule and manage calendar appointments and events. SMS service for users to query today and tomorrow's appointments in their Windows Live Calendar	Final
Contacts Mobile					Web-based version of Windows Live Contacts designed for mobile devices for access to contact information. Client-based version allows integration of the Windows Live contact list with the mobile device's address book. Also allow users to query contact information via SMS	Final
Groups Mobile					Web-based version of Windows Live Groups designed for mobile devices	Final
Outlook Mobile					Web- and client-based version of Outlook that targets mobile devices, and allow new email alerts via SMS	Final
Windows Live Messenger Mobile					Web- and client-based version of Windows Live Messenger that is designed for mobile devices, and allow users to send instant messages via SMS	Final
Profile Mobile					View and update user's own Windows Live Profile information using a mobile device	Final
OneDrive Mobile					Web-based version of OneDrive designed for mobile devices for accessing documents stored on the cloud. Client-based version allows upload of photos directly from a mobile phone camera.	Final

== Bing Mobile ==
Bing Mobile (previously Live Search Mobile) is a mobile website and collection of applications that serves as a central hub for Bing services and websites in the form of "cards" that present information in a similar manner as Google Now and enables Bing Rewards for US-based users. The Bing Mobile homepage shows the most popular search results in the form of a card, and can be personalised to show headlines based on the user's personal settings.

=== Bing for mobile browser - m.bing.com ===
Mobile browsing allows users to access Bing on their mobile devices through WAP or GPRS connection. The interface is optimized for viewing on mobile handsets. Users can:

- Search the web for information
- Get news information
- Find local businesses in the user's local area
- Get maps and driving directions
- Get answers to questions
- In the UK and Japan – "Find My Location" to pinpoint a user's location

In the US on HTML-ready mobile devices such as iPhone, Android, and touch-screen Windows phones, further features are available:

- Automatic location detection (geolocation)
- Suggested local listings based on location and time of day
- Save listings to Favourites, and send that list to friends
- Movie listings with clips and trailers
- Sports scores and stats, with real-time updates during games

The Bing for mobile browser is available in 31 markets worldwide.

=== Bing for mobile application ===
The Mobile Application is available as a Java ME application for non-Windows phones, as a richer .NET Framework application for Windows Phones, and as an application for BlackBerry OS, Android, iOS, and Binary Runtime Environment for Wireless (BREW). It provides local listings, maps (road and aerial satellite), driving directions, and traffic conditions. Other features include:

- Predictive text input
- Browse and search through business categories
- Image search and image exploration
- Speech recognition search input
- Search results include a phone number and address; users may click to call for an immediate connection
- Send search results to others using SMS
- Find maps for specific addresses
- Get directions to and from a destination
- Get turn by turn directions using a GPS receiver
- View traffic information for major roads in selected cities
- Get weather forecasts
- View movie showtimes and theatres
- Turn-by-turn navigation for Windows 6.x phones.
- A hub in Windows Phone 7.x and later devices.
- For Android it includes a built-in browser
- Bing Rewards
- The ability to set the device's lock screen based on Bing's daily images

The Bing app for iOS (iPhone, iPod Touch, iPad) includes these further features:

- Barcode and cover art scanning
- Enhanced product listings
- Social updates from Facebook and Twitter
- Social search – see results from social network alongside web results
- Share search results on Facebook, Twitter, or through email

The Bing app is available in the US on a variety of Windows phones, Android platform devices, all BlackBerry devices, several BREW devices, iPhone and iPod Touch, and Sidekick devices.

=== Bing 411 ===
In the United States, Microsoft operated a toll-free number (1-800-BING-411 or 1-800-CALL-411) for directory assistance called Bing 411. This service used voice search technologies powered by Tellme. Users are able to find and connect for free to local shops and restaurants and obtain driving directions, traffic reports, sports scores, stock quotes, weather reports through this service. These numbers were discontinued on June 1, 2012.

As a replacement for the above numbers, a non-toll-free number was set up at 330-247-7411. This number has also since been discontinued, with callers directed to dial 408-752-8052 instead.

== Cortana ==
In 2014 Microsoft launched Cortana with the Windows Phone 8.1 operating system, Cortana is a digital personal assistant with music searching capabilities and has the ability to tell jokes, show the latest headlines, predict sports events, enable "quiet hours" and show relevant local data using Foursquare.

== Groove Mobile ==
Groove Music was launched with Windows Phone 8 and Windows 8 as Xbox Music, a rebranded version of Zune, in Windows Phone 8 the service was included in the Music + Videos Hub and allows users to download the content they've bought via the Xbox Music Pass and stream it to their PCs. Originally Xbox Music was a Windows and Windows Phone exclusive application, but was launched in iTunes and Google Play in 2013 though the Windows Phone application did have more features than its counterparts but was criticised for unbundling several core features from the service such as podcasts and FM radio (which got their own applications) with the launch of Windows Phone 8.1.

In 2015 Microsoft enabled OneDrive integration that allows users to stream the songs they've stored on OneDrive via Groove Music. The service works only if the files are in a OneDrive folder named "Music" and otherwise can't detect any other songs. It currently only supports MP3, M4A (AAC), and WMA files.

== JobLens and Internships Lens ==
JobLens (previously Nokia JobLens), Boston University JobLens and Internships Lens are augmented reality applications, JobsLens was originally launched in 2013 and largely features the same user interface as the CityLens application, it uses the Here maps' LiveSight technology to visualise the possible employment options of the user, JobLens offers filters for specific jobs based on the user's preferences and jobs recommended by people in the user's social networks. JobLens gathers data from LinkedIn, Salary.com, and Zillow. JobLens users may use Microsoft OneDrive to store their CVs on.

Internships Lens is an augmented reality application developed by Microsoft Mobile (previously Nokia) in cooperation with Internships.com and works similar to JobLens. It also uses the Here Maps' LiveSight technology to augment possible employment information. Unlike JobLens, Internship Lens offers the ability to research employers. It has over 75,000 internships by over 40,000 but is largely limited to geography and offers mostly American information. The service doesn't function outside of the United States. Like JobLens, Internships Lens is powered by Nokia's HERE Maps service and can be launched from both the Microsoft Camera's lens feature and from the app launcher. Despite most Here powered services being owned by Nokia, Microsoft got the JobLens and Internships Lens after the acquisition.

Microsoft announced that they will retire the applications on June 1, 2015, from the Windows Phone Store.

== Lumia Beta Apps ==
Lumia Beta Apps (previously the Nokia Beta Labs) facilitates beta applications being developed by Microsoft or select 3rd party developers for Lumia products. The applications are of reasonably good quality, but may have rough edges and occasional service breaks, not commercialized yet, not guaranteed to be published, not officially supported, under active development, free of charge, not be used for commercial purposes.

Applications may graduate to become commercial offerings, or they will be archived along with the lessons learnt based on user feedback. Microsoft collects feedback through UserVoice and has since launched several new applications such as Cinemagraph Beta and Gestures. Originally the site was operated by Nokia but Microsoft moved the development to a more feedback-orientated design in August 2014 to allow more users to add their feedback rather than just Nokia-developers. Microsoft has discontinued the Nokia Camera Beta trial and re-released the Beta app as "Lumia Camera Classic" while implementing the new features in the Lumia Camera app, and has added OneDrive integration to Lumia Cinemagraph (formerly Nokia Cinemagraph) after first trialing it in the Lumia Beta Apps site. On 25 February 2015, Join Conference (previously Nokia Conference) was made public for all Windows Phones but republished under the Microsoft Garage, and reduced the number of markets it was available in.

== Lumia imaging applications ==
Lumia imaging apps (earlier the Nokia imaging apps) are a series of imaging applications formerly by Nokia and now by Microsoft Mobile, which are bundled with its Lumia line of Windows Phone smartphones. Lumia imaging applications were originally based on technology from the Nokia acquisition of Scalado. Some software e.g. the Lumia Cinemagraph app enables the creation of subtle animated GIFs (or Cinemagraphs) from images.

With the launch of Windows 10 Mobile Microsoft would include the Lumia Camera application as a part of the system and would no longer become a Lumia exclusive application unlike the other imaging apps. With the launch of the Lumia Imaging SDK 3.0 Microsoft announced that the Lumia Imaging SDK would support the Windows 10 Universal Application Platform and could be written in the same languages as other Windows 10 applications such as C#, C++, JavaScript, and Visual Basic. Other than that the Lumia Imaging SDK would also be able to be implemented for form factors other than just Nokia and Microsoft Lumia smartphones as the SDK could now be used for tablets and computers.

== Mail Mobile ==
In Windows Phone Microsoft bundled a preinstalled email client that supports Outlook.com, Exchange, Yahoo! Mail, iCloud, IBM Notes Traveler and Gmail natively and supports many other services via the POP and IMAP protocols (the latter was added with Windows Phone 8.1). Contacts and calendars can be synchronized from other services as well. Users can also search through their email by searching in the subject, body, senders, and receivers, previously opened attachments can also found through the search function. Emails are shown with threads, and multiple email inboxes can be combined into a single view (a feature commonly referred to as "combined inbox") or can viewed separately.

== Microsoft Community ==
Microsoft Community (previously known as the Microsoft Mobile Community, Nokia Support Discussions, Nokia Discussions, and Ovi Support Discussions) is a discussion board where users can ask questions about Microsoft Mobile devices and services and contribute by giving insight and information. The website hosts information about Symbian (including non-Nokia Symbian devices by other OEMs), MeeGo, S30, S40, Asha and Lumia devices, and also serves as a forum for news and updates on Microsoft Mobile's online services and applications.

On June 27, 2015, Microsoft launched Microsoft Mobile Devices Community by merging the existing Nokia with the Windows Phone Community and making it a collection of categories in the Microsoft Community. The ranks and points earned by users of the Microsoft Mobile Community migrated, as well as all the articles and discussions, discussions concerning "legacy Nokia-branded Microsoft devices" (Symbian, Maemo, MeeGo, S30, S30+, S40, etc.) were also migrated to the Microsoft Community, and the Mobile Devices Community also offered a place for non-Lumia Windows-based devices. It was further renamed to Microsoft Community in 2016.

== Microsoft Data Gathering ==
Microsoft Data Gathering (previously Nokia Data Gathering) is an application designed for NGOs and charities originally launched on Symbian and Series 40 devices and launched for Windows Phone 7 in 2012. Microsoft Data Gathering enables organisations to create questionnaires that they can send over to fieldworkers via WiFi and mobile networks, the application has had several past successes such as in Brazil where the Nokia Data Gathering application was used by the Health Vigilance Foundation to track the spread of dengue fever. The software was originally developed by the Instituto Nokia de Tecnologia, a Brazilian research centre founded by Nokia.

== Microsoft Devices Blog ==
Microsoft Devices Blog (originally Nokia Conversations, launched in 2008, and later Lumia Conversations) and Lumia Conversations UK (formerly NokNok.TV) are news blogs by Microsoft that deliver the latest information about Lumia phones, Windows Phone applications and corporate life at Microsoft while also offering news about other Microsoft services and Nokia branded feature phones. The sites are also used to host videos of Microsoft Lumia related events such as the Mobile World Congress in Barcelona, Catalonia. Lumia Conversations UK operates a podcast service known as The Nok where they discuss the latest news on Microsoft Lumia related topics and technologies, discuss the products in depth and review applications for Lumia handsets.

On September 30, 2015, Microsoft announced that they would merge Lumia Conversations with Microsoft Surface Blog to form the new Microsoft Devices Blog. All old Nokia and Surface articles were migrated to the new site. This move reflected the larger reorganisation where Microsoft would put all their commercial hardware teams into a single division. Other than Lumia and Surface devices, the blog would also feature news on other Microsoft hardware devices such as the Microsoft Band and Microsoft HoloLens.

== Microsoft Education Delivery ==
Microsoft Education Delivery (previously Nokia Education Delivery, and alternatively called Text2Teach) is a service operated by Microsoft (and earlier by Nokia) in developing countries to deliver education material over mobile telephones. It operates in countries like the Philippines where it is used in over 38,000 public schools and has been running for 10 years, debuting on the Nokia 3310 device.

== Microsoft Maths ==
Microsoft Maths, also known as Microsoft Mathematics or Microsoft Maths Solver, is a freely downloadable educational program, designed for Microsoft Windows, and mobile platforms, that allows users to solve math and science problems. Developed and maintained by Microsoft, it is primarily targeted at students as a learning tool. Microsoft Math app is also available on iPhones and iPads. On Android, it is available as a Math Helper feature within the Bing app.

== Microsoft Software Updater ==
Microsoft Software Updater (earlier Nokia Software Updater and Ovi Suite Software Updater) is a Windows utility launched in 2007, that enables customers to update and recover their mobile device firmware of a S40, S60 or Lumia device from any Internet enabled access point. The service was launched in beta in 2006, and the Nokia Software Updater's beta phase ended at 25 August 2011, and started offering a similar service named Nokia Download!, a utility for downloading content to mobile phones. Nokia Software Updater 3.0.495 was released in 2011. After acquisition by Microsoft, the utility was renamed to Microsoft Software Updater. The service can be used to restore the firmware on "bricked" phones which previously could only be done at local Nokia Care customer service centers.

== MixRadio ==
MixRadio (formerly Nokia MixRadio, Nokia Music Store, and OVI Music Store) is a music service that was launched as Nokia Ovi Store on 29 August 2007 by Nokia. MixRadio allows free streaming of playlists without any subscriptions or ads. It is available in 31 countries, including the US, Brazil, India and China. Microsoft sold the service to the LINE Corporation in 2015 and it now operates as a subsidiary called MixRadio Ltd.

== Motion Data ==
Motion Data (previously the Nokia Motion Monitor) is a SensorCore based activity tracker included in Microsoft Lumia devices that collects data on a user's steps and physical location for usage in third party applications. Motion Data is included under settings in newer Microsoft Lumia devices and displays user information such as recent insights on physical activity in a timeline. It can be organised for intensity and shows data averages for daily, weekly, and monthly activity. Motion Data also maps the route where the device has been and lists the applications that have access to the Lumia SensorCore.

In November 2015 Microsoft updated Motion Data's user interface to match that of Windows 10 Mobile, added more detailed data collection, and added a list of applications that can utilize the Motion Data service.

== Movies & TV ==
Originally Movies & TV was known as Xbox Video, which was rebranded from Zune alongside Xbox Music with the launch of Windows 8 in 2012. Despite being included in Windows Phone 8 and Microsoft stating that Windows Phone 8 could use Xbox Video in the operating system on their websites and press releases, the service itself didn't allow for the downloading and streaming of content until the launch of Windows Phone 8.1.

Movies & TV ais a video streaming service that allows streaming content on multiple devices but lacks the ability to save playback. It integrates with Xbox SmartGlass and can be accessed from the web.

== MSN Mobile ==
MSN Mobile (previously Pocket MSN) includes mobile information and communications services for mobile devices from Microsoft as part of their MSN, Windows Live, and Bing range of services. Many MSN sites can be directly accessed from mobile devices. MSN applications and services come either pre-installed and bundled with Windows Mobile, Windows Phone, and Windows. More recently Microsoft has also started bundling their services with their Nokia-branded feature phones.

MSN Mobile product offerings originate from two mobile-focused groups within Microsoft's online services division. The oldest group, named Windows Live Mobile, primarily delivers SMS and WAP-based services. The newer group, MSN Mobile, started in August 2006 focused on bringing MSN premium and user generated content to mobile devices via both mobile browse and client applications. In 2014 Microsoft rebranded their Bing suite of applications to the MSN and subsequently released their MSN suite of applications for other platforms.

== Nokia Mail and Nokia Chat ==
Nokia Mail and Nokia Chat (earlier Nokia Messaging and Ovi Mail) was launched on 13 August 2008 as a beta release of "Nokia Email service", a push e-mail service, later incorporated into Nokia Messaging. Nokia Messaging operated as a centralized, hosted service that acts as a proxy between the Messaging client and the user's e-mail server. The phone does not connect directly to the e-mail server, but instead sends e-mail credentials to Microsoft's servers. Microsoft discontinued the service for Microsoft Lumia devices and advised its users to migrate to Microsoft Skype. Microsoft officially discontinued the service alongside Nokia Mail on 9 March 2015 and Nokia accounts on April 19, 2015, in favour of Microsoft's own instant messaging service, Skype and Microsoft's own e-mailing service, Outlook.com.

== Nokia Store ==
Nokia Store (formerly the Ovi Store) was the application store for the Nokia Asha platform and the Nokia X platform. Customers could download mobile games, applications, videos, images, and ringtones to their Asha and X devices, the store also listed Symbian and MeeGo applications, though developers could no longer launch nor update them. In January 2015 Microsoft announced that they'll encourage developers to migrate their apps to the Opera Mobile Store and Microsoft will officially close down the Nokia Store on 31 March 2015. Microsoft officially stopped accepting new applications to the Nokia Publish service and new registrations to the Nokia Publish and Nokia Developer websites since 18 February 2015, and officially retired the Nokia Developer site on 31 March 2015 and encouraged developers to go to the MSDN, TechNet and Windows Developer sites (where Nokia Developer's content was migrated) to develop applications for Windows Phone and Windows. The Nokia Store was officially closed on 31 March 2015.

== Office Mobile ==
Microsoft Office Mobile (previously Pocket Office) was originally launched in 1998 with Windows CE v1.0, it is a suite of applications that comes bundled with the Windows Phone and has separately downloadable versions for iOS and Android, and was previously available for Windows Mobile and Symbian.

Microsoft Office Mobile has 4 core applications which are Microsoft Word Mobile, Microsoft Excel Mobile, Microsoft PowerPoint Mobile, and Microsoft OneNote Mobile, besides the core applications Office Mobile offers separately downloadable versions of Teams, SharePoint, the Microsoft Lens(Formerly Office Lens), the Office Remote, and Microsoft Office 365 apps.

In 2014, Microsoft acquired Acompli, a company that developed an email and calendar application for Android and iOS which was rebranded as Outlook Mobile. In October 2015 Microsoft announced that another acquisition, Sunrise Calendar would be integrated into the Outlook Mobile application. After Sunrise Calendar's features are integrated Microsoft announced that it would discontinue the application but that it is still available for download in Google Play, and the App Store before its official discontinuation.

Office Sway currently has an iOS and Windows 10 app, with a Windows 10 Mobile in development.

=== Microsoft Lens ===
Lens logo

Microsoft Lens (formerly Microsoft Office Lens) was a OneNote companion app designed to capture, scan and enhance images of whiteboards and printed documents, including traditional business cards, and store them in various formats including PDF, JPG, Word, OneNote, PowerPoint as well as contact address-book databases (e.g.for business cards). The application was limited in its ability to capture multi page documents. From later updates it can capture multipage documents. It has smart intelligent actions eg: Scanning QR codes for detecting links, Extract text from documents, Scan table, Read aloud text etc.

Microsoft announced the Lens is set to be retired on December 15, 2025, Lens was removed from the App Store and Google Play on February 9, 2026, Lens was officially shutting down on March 9, 2026, and their migration to OneDrive.

=== Office Remote ===
Office Remote was originally launched by Microsoft Research in November 2013 to control Microsoft Word, Microsoft Excel, and Microsoft PowerPoint documents using a device running Android or a Windows Phone. It required Microsoft Office 2013 (except for Office 2013 RT) or an Office 365 subscription to work. As of September 2019, the required mobile apps were no longer available. Office Remote had the following capabilities:

- For Microsoft PowerPoint, Office Remote enabled large buttons to make presentations more easily accessible, forward and backward slides, view thumbnails and jump to a side as well as access speakers while presenting a PowerPoint file and have access to the direction of the presentation with an on-screen laser pointer.
- For Microsoft Excel Office, Remote could jump between spreadsheets, graphs and any named object via gestures, change spreadsheets with swiping, navigate through columns and rows and use PivotTables and filters to change the levels of zoom.
- For Microsoft Word, Office Remote offered zoom control and scrolling.

=== Office 365 Video ===
In April 2015, Microsoft launched Office 365 Video, a private video sharing service for the subscribers of Office 365 Academic or Enterprise license. Office 365 Video can be used for training, promotional and informative videos for employees of companies whose intranets do not support video sharing capabilities. The service comes with a mobile app for iPhone.

=== Outlook Groups ===
Outlook Groups was a mobile collaboration application that can be used with Office 365 domains, Microsoft accounts, work accounts or school accounts, despite its name it's not related to Outlook 365 Groups and these two similarly named services do not share many features and Outlook Groups does not integrate with either Yammer and Office 365 Groups. Though the application is free to download the service can exclusively be used by Office 365 subscribers and further integrates with Microsoft Office's other services like OneNote (with which users can collaborate in "notebook") and the core services like Word, Excel, and PowerPoint. In October 2015 Microsoft added Admin functions which added the ability to create groups, manage members of a group, mention full names, highlight and deep link to a user's profile card. Outlook Groups was retired by Microsoft on May 1, 2018 The functionality was replaced by adding the "Groups node" to the folder list within the Outlook mobile app.

== Photosynth ==
Microsoft Photosynth is a discontinued digital photo analyser from the Microsoft Live Labs and the University of Washington that can generate three-dimensional models and point clouds of photographs.

Users have the option to geotag their digital shots on sites such as Flickr and then upload them to the online Photosynth web service. Images uploaded on Photosynth give people the ability to seamlessly view landmarks, public spaces and objects from all sides. The web service can walk or fly through a scene to see photos from any angle, zoom in or out of a photo, see where pictures were taken in relation to one another, smoothly change viewing angle between nearby photos, smoothly zoom in and out of high-resolution photos and find similar photos to the one displayed.

In July 2015 Microsoft announced that they would discontinue the mobile applications for Photosynth from their mobile software distribution platforms but that they will continue to support the application for users who already installed it and that the service would exclusively act as a web service. In February 2017, Microsoft discontinued the service altogether.

== Remote Desktop ==
Microsoft launched the remote desktop service for several mobile platforms starting in 2013 with the service's launch on iPhones, iPads and Android tablets, the service features multi-touch capabilities, and thanks to compressing technology can also stream video and audio files, connect to external monitors and display presentations from their mobile device. A year after the Remote Desktop service's initial launch Microsoft expanded it to the Windows Phone platform, which later got Azure RemoteApp support.

=== Mobile browsing ===
Mobile Browsing allows users to access MSN content and services optimized for their mobile devices. Users can:

- Get MSNBC breaking news
- View latest Fox Sports highlights and scores
- Catch up on latest MSN Entertainment, celebrity and movie news
- Watch videos from the MSN Video service
- Find local movie and showtimes in the user's local area
- Get local MSN weather forecast
- Check their daily horoscope
- Search the web for information
- Chat with online buddies with Windows Live Messenger
- Get maps and driving directions
- Peruse
- Get answers to questions

=== Mobile applications ===
MSN Mobile client software is preloaded on many newer PDA and phones. Some carriers charge a premium to access this service. The client software usually allows IM and email access; some versions provide access to Spaces and Search as well. This application is available on Android, Windows Phone BlackBerry, and later on iPad. in 2014 Microsoft rebranded Bing's suite of mobile applications to the MSN brand renaming their Windows Phone and Windows Store clients from Bing to MSN, these new applications are MSN Money (formerly Bing Finance), MSN Weather, MSN News, MSN Sport, MSN Food & Drink, and MSN Health & Fitness (which absorbed MSN Healthy Living). Later these applications were launched on iOS and Android. The redesign of the applications and site proved positive and helped increase traffic with an additional 10.000.000 of daily visitors. Sections include MSN News, MSN Entertainment, MSN Sports, MSN Money & Finance, MSN Lifestyle, MSN Videos, MSN Autos, MSN Travel, msnNOW, MSN Online Safety & Security, MSN Career, Family & Living, MSN Education, MSN Shopping, MSN Health, My MSN, and Wonderwall. Though MSN mobile applications have evolved into full featured standalone versions bringing together multiple MSN sections into specialised applications, historical MSN apps were mere readers for the website and often didn't include any features other than the ability to read articles.

== Skype Mobile ==
Skype has mobile applications for most mobile operating systems and comes pre-installed on Windows Phone 8.1 and Windows RT 8.1, Skype Mobile is popular among enterprises who use it for business communications but has been criticized for its lackluster and whimsical video quality, in 2014 Microsoft started improving on the quality Skype's mobile applications and fixed a notification bug that would notify users on various devices they've signed into with their Skype account even if they are actively using it on one of their devices.

After Microsoft acquired Skype they also got their mobile services including GroupMe and Qik.

=== GroupMe ===
GroupMe is a mobile group messaging service for Windows Phone, Android and iOS, GroupMe allows users to send text messages to anyone in their contact lists and notifies users of planned events in their calendars. The service was launched in May 2010. When Microsoft announced their plans to acquire Skype in May 2011 Skype, Skype acquired GroupMe in August 2011 as the Microsoft-Skype merger wasn't passed through regulations, GroupMe was then just a year old startup company at the time of their acquisition by Skype Technologies.

=== Skype Qik ===
Qik, Inc. was originally a video messaging company, it was acquired by Skype Technologies in 2011, and was eventually integrated into Skype's features with the original Qik client being retired by Microsoft in April 2014.

Later in 2014 Microsoft relaunched Qik as a video message sharing application for Windows Phone, Android and iOS that requires users to register their mobile telephone numbers and send and receive messages to and from contacts in their phonebooks. Videos created via Skype Qik can't be shared or saved in any way or form and will be automatically deleted after a short period of time.

On February 22, 2016, Microsoft announced their plans to retire the Skype Qik app on March 24 citing low usage. Many features from the app have been integrated into the Skype app.

=== Skype WiFi ===
Skype WiFi (previously known as Skype Access) is a service designed to provide cheap WiFi all over the world which is accessible through an iPhone and Android app, when the service launched Skype offered the service free of charge for an entire weekend. In 2012 the service was expanded to the United Kingdom and provided it in the form of routers and would be gratis for owners of a Skype account during the entire month of October. In 2013 Microsoft launched the Skype WiFi app in the Windows Store and at the time Microsoft claimed that the service works with over a million hotspots around the world. In June 2015, Microsoft announced that they were in the process of rebranding Skype WiFi into Microsoft WiFi.

=== Skype for Business ===
In 2015 Microsoft rebranded the Lync messaging service to Skype for Business, a move accompanied by the fact that the Microsoft Lync team and Skype Technologies were moved into a single business unit. Alongside the rebranding Microsoft added several features from Skype such as video conferencing and calling alongside several new features and graphical user interface changes such as searching contacts, full-screen videos, and call managing. IT admins can use Active Directory Authentication Library-based authentication to configure multi-factor authentication for the Skype for Business mobile application. The Skype for Business application was first rebranded on Windows Phone in July 2015 and was gradually introduced to other platforms.

Despite its branding Skype for Business is a part of Microsoft Office and can only be used by Microsoft Office 365 subscribers and users of Microsoft Office Professional Plus.

== TechRewards ==
TechRewards (previously DVLUP) is a developer programme by Microsoft Mobile (originally Nokia) that encourages developers to make Windows Phone Store and Windows Store (and formerly Nokia Asha, and Nokia X) applications and rewards developers who update and create applications. The DVLUP platform exists to increase visibility and quality of the applications by its users and functions as a pilot programme which allows users to create, book and manage their own application's promotion and marketing. Under Microsoft the Nokia Developer Ambassador program was abolished. The service is currently available in over 192 markets.

In April 2015 Microsoft updated the DVLUP programme as a part of the Microsoft Developer Network and made it mandatory for new and existing users to have a Microsoft account, and would migrate all past content, history, points, and data during this move and added single-sign in for MSDN users and gave the platform a visual facelift to make it more aligned with the MSDN and other Microsoft properties. The new site was called the Windows Developer Rewards programme and has turned the site to resemble more like a game so that developers would have "more fun" while earning points.

== Video games ==
Microsoft develops a few video games for Microsoft Lumia handsets. The general trend in these games is saving the environment.

- Modern Mayor (previously Nokia Modern Mayor) is a Sim City-like game where the player is placed as a mayor of a dystopian city and has to reconstruct and improve the city's environment. The game is designed to raise awareness on pollution and in-app purchases go to real life charities.
- Climate Mission (previously Nokia Climate Mission) and Climate Mission 3D (previously Nokia Climate Mission 3D) are mobile games designed to educate the player on reducing their carbon footprint. The game has three basic levels: ants; trees; and icebergs. Each category contains twenty different levels.

== Xbox ==
Windows Phone 7 was the first mobile operating system to have Xbox Live integration in a mobile app dubbed Xbox Live Extras, and with launch of Windows Phone 7.5 Microsoft included Xbox Live in the operating system's Games Hub. Xbox Live on Windows Phone enables users to edit their avatars, communicate with people from their Xbox Live friends list, and hosts the games installed on the device.

=== SmartGlass ===
Xbox SmartGlass is a companion application for the Xbox 360 and Xbox One consoles that enables users to connect their mobile devices with their consoles. The Xbox SmartGlass enables users to launch applications, play their music and videos, and control a select number of games and interact with an additional layer of the Xbox's TV settings. SmartGlass has been dubbed Microsoft's answer to the Nintendo WiiU's second screen.

== See also ==
- Google Mobile Services
- List of Microsoft software
- Windows Store
- Windows Marketplace for Mobile
- Windows Phone Store
- My Phone
- My Windows Phone
