= Microsoft Office Mix =

Microsoft Office suite product

- Original author: Microsoft Corporation
- Release: 2014
- Operating system: Windows
- Platform: Office
- License: Proprietary
- Website: www.microsoft.com

Microsoft Office Mix (or simply "Office Mix") was a service offered by Microsoft as part of their Office suite. Introduced in 2014, Mix was offered as part of an Office 365 subscription, before it was retired on May 1, 2018. The Office Mix website remains active, however upon visiting the site, it presents a message that states that the service is now unavailable.

Office Mix was an Office add-in that integrated into the PowerPoint program that was intended as an educational service to assist teachers with creating interactive class presentations. It allowed the user to perform various tasks such as inserting ink, narrations, polls, and screen captures directly into the presentation, share their creation (otherwise referred to as a (singular) "mix" or (plural) "mixes") by exporting the mix into a computer video format or publishing it to online Office 365 Video platform, and view statistical data on users viewing their creations through analytics tools. The service was available for Office 2013 and Office 2016 and it was only made available to the Windows operating system.

== Installation ==
Office Mix did not come embedded into the PowerPoint program. Instead, the user had to obtain the Office Mix add-in installer through the mix.office.com website in order to integrate the Office Mix add-in to the PowerPoint program and a global tab named "Mix" would appear across the application's interface where the user could access various options related to Office Mix.

Note: The user would be required to attest their ownership of an active Office 365 subscription through their personal Microsoft account or one that is managed by their organization or institution, or a compatible external SSO service such as a Google account or Facebook account.

== Features ==
The Office Mix service allowed the following features to the user:

- Drawing ink and annotating PowerPoint presentations, and inserting narrations, polls, and screen captures directly.
- Share the user's creations on Office Mix (otherwise referred to as a (singular) "mix" or (plural) "mixes") by exporting the mix into a computer video format or publishing it to the online Office 365 Video platform.
- Generate and view statistical data on users viewing their creations through analytics tools.

== Discontinuation ==
Beginning May 1, 2018, the Office Mix service was officially retired by Microsoft and became inaccessible to all customers after users were sent an e-mail notification issuing them several months to retrieve all of their content and mixes off of the platform prior to shutdown. After the discontinuation, the features of Office Mix were instead embedded into the PowerPoint program to users who obtained Office via an Office 365 subscription which remain available.
