= Docs.com =

Public document sharing service from Microsoft

- Website type: File hosting service
- Dissolved: December 15, 2017; 8 years ago
- Successor: SlideShare
- Owner: Microsoft
- Website: docs.com
- Registration: Microsoft Account (required to upload files)
- Launched: April 21, 2010; 16 years ago
- Current status: Discontinued on December 15, 2017

Docs.com was a website where users could discover, upload and share Office documents. Supported file types included Word documents, Excel spreadsheets, PowerPoint presentations, Mix video presentations and Sways. Users could also add PDFs and URLs on to their page. Docs.com was a part of Microsoft Office Online.

On June 9, 2017, Microsoft announced it would shut down Docs.com on December 15, 2017 in favor of the acquired SlideShare with its LinkedIn purchase. It is now a redirect to Microsoft's technical documentation that resides at docs.microsoft.com.

== Collaboration with Facebook ==
Prior to its redesign Docs.com was a collaboration between Microsoft FUSE Labs and Facebook to provide a basic online document editing suite, similar to Google Docs. It is designed to make it easy to discover, create and share Office documents with your Facebook friends. It was announced and officially launched during Facebook f8 conference on April 21, 2010 by Mark Zuckerberg and Lili Cheng.

Docs.com originally offered the capability to upload or create new Word, Excel or PowerPoint documents. Users may view and edit documents online even if they did not have Microsoft Office installed on their device. However, the docs.com web editors integrate with Office so that users may edit documents on their PC or Mac and save them directly back to the cloud. Docs.com also supports upload and in-browser viewing of PDF documents. In January 2011, the site gained support for additional languages.

Docs.com for Facebook was targeting individual users (e.g. students). A similar offering from Microsoft Office Live is directed at business customers.

=== Technical details ===
The Facebook-based Docs.com used Facebook Connect for user authentication. Furthermore, the service was modeled after the Facebook Photos application and uses similar sharing settings so that users may easily invite their friends to either view or edit their documents. Docs.com integrates into the Facebook UI much like photos by providing a homepage within Facebook, a profile tab, and by posting documents to a user's Facebook Wall. The service is built using Microsoft's Office Web Apps and was compatible with the contemporary major browsers: Internet Explorer, Firefox, Safari and Chrome.

=== Support for Facebook pages ===
Docs.com announced support for Facebook pages on July 8, 2010. Facebook page administrators had the option to create a shared folder where they may upload, create and edit shared documents. Documents can easily be posted to a Facebook page for the page's fans to view. Learn how the functionality works or how it was built.

== 2015 redesign ==
In 2015, Microsoft launched a new version of Docs.com. The redesigned service was created to make sharing documents less difficult over the web while also preserving source formatting. Among the supported formats are Microsoft Word, Microsoft PowerPoint, Microsoft Excel, PDF, and Office Sway among other Office-supported file-types, furthermore Docs.com offers importing features to quickly fetch documents from a user's PC and other Microsoft services such as OneDrive. Docs.com also supports commenting and the downloading of documents, but lacks the feature for users to collaborate on the same documents.

As part of the relaunch of Docs.com Microsoft merged its web accumulation software, Curah! with Docs.com, and at the time of the announcement launched the Windows 10 application for Office Sway which also integrated several of Curah!'s features.

== 2017 case of sensitive documents ==
On 25 March 2017, Microsoft temporarily disabled the search feature after the security researcher Kevin Beaumount discovered that some users had inadvertently uploaded confidential documents containing sensitive information such as passwords, social security numbers and bank statements. The search feature was restored on 27 March. According to PCWorld, many other document and productivity services (including Microsoft's) by default upload the document as private. However, users of Docs.com were in error as to the purpose of the service, despite its tagline "Share your work with the world".
