= Microsoft Sway =

Web-based presentation software

- Website type: Presentation program
- Available in: 39 languages
- List of languages: Basque; Bulgarian; Catalan; Chinese (Simplified); Chinese (Traditional); Croatian; Czech; Danish; Dutch; English; Estonian; Finnish; French; Galician; German; Greek; Hungarian; Indonesian; Italian; Japanese; Kazakh; Korean; Latvian; Lithuanian; Malay(Malaysia); Norwegian (Bokmal); Polish; Portuguese; Portuguese (Brazil); Romanian; Russian; Serbian (Cyrillic, Serbia); Serbian (Latin, Serbia); Slovak; Slovenian; Spanish; Swedish; Turkish; Ukrainian
- Owner: Microsoft
- Website: sway.cloud.microsoft
- IPv6 support: Yes
- Commercial: No
- Registration: Required
- Launched: 2014; 12 years ago
- Current status: Released

Sway for Windows 10
- Release: 5 August 2015; 11 years ago
- Operating system: Windows 10
- Size: 83.07 MB
- Website: apps.microsoft.com/detail/9wzdncrd2g0j

Sway for iOS
- Release: 8 January 2015; 11 years ago
- Final release: 1.20.1 / 19 July 2017; 9 years ago
- Operating system: iOS
- Size: 79.2 MB
- Available in: 28 languages
- List of languages English, Catalan, Croatian, Czech, Danish, Dutch, Finnish, French, German, Greek, Hungarian, Indonesian, Italian, Japanese, Korean, Malay, Norwegian Bokmål, Polish, Portuguese, Romanian, Russian, Simplified Chinese, Slovak, Spanish, Swedish, Traditional Chinese, Turkish, Ukrainian
- Website: itunes.apple.com/app/office-sway/id929856545

Microsoft Sway is a presentation program and is part of the Microsoft 365 family of products. Sway was offered for general release by Microsoft in August 2015. It allows users who have a Microsoft account to combine text and media to create a presentable website. Users can pull content locally from the device in use, or from internet sources such as Bing, Facebook, OneDrive, and YouTube. Sway is distinguished from Microsoft FrontPage and Microsoft Expression Web – unrelated web design programs previously developed by Microsoft – in that Sway includes a method for hosting sites.

Sway sites are stored on Microsoft's servers and are tied to the user's Microsoft account. They can be viewed and edited from any web browser through Office on the web. There is no offline editing or viewing function, but sites can be accessed using the app for Windows, and formerly iOS.

== History ==
Sway was developed internally by Microsoft. In late 2014, the company announced an invite-only preview version of Sway and announced that Sway would not require an Office 365 subscription. An iOS app was released as a preview on 31 October 2014, but was discontinued on 17 December 2018 due to low usage.

As of July 17, 2021, the Sway iOS app's discontinuance in 2018 was the last piece of news posted in the Sway tech blog. The Sway feature blog has not received an update since April 2017. The Microsoft Office Roadmap did not include any items related to Sway ever since. The iOS application is no longer under active development, and is not available for download.

Since 2023, Microsoft has been consolidating the domains of its Microsoft 365 apps and services under cloud.microsoft. By 2025, the vast majority of services, including Sway, have already migrated to the cloud.microsoft domain.

== Features ==
Users are able to add content from various sources into their Sway presentations. Some of the integrated services are owned by Microsoft, including OneNote, Bing, and other Sway sites. The program also provides native integration with other services, including YouTube, Facebook, Twitter, Mixcloud, and Infogram.
