= Microsoft Clipchamp =

Online video editor by Microsoft

- Clipchamp Logo

- Screenshot of Clipchamp editor, running on Windows 11
- Original author: Clipchamp Pty Ltd.
- Developer: Microsoft
- Release: 2013; 13 years ago

Stable release(s) [±]
- Windows: 4.7.10220 / November 1, 2026; 11 days ago
- iOS (discontinued): 2.3.17 / April 6, 2026; 7 months ago
- Operating system: Windows 10, 11; Web; Discontinued: iOS (2026)
- Type: Video editing software
- License: Freemium
- Website: clipchamp.com/en/

Microsoft Clipchamp is a freemium video editing tool developed by Australian company Clipchamp Pty Ltd., a subsidiary of Microsoft. It is a web-based, non-linear editing software that allows users to import, edit, and export audiovisual material in a web browser window. The application is designed to be easy to use for beginners.

Clipchamp has offices in Australia, the Philippines, Germany, and the United States. According to figures published by the company, at the beginning of 2021, it had more than 14 million users worldwide. In September 2021, Clipchamp Pty Ltd. was acquired by Microsoft. It has since been offered in a personal version through a Microsoft account and in a business or education version through a work or school account that is built on OneDrive and SharePoint.

== Features ==
Microsoft Clipchamp has multiple features that allow further creativity and accessibility. Since July 2023, users can drag and drop files from their computer, OneDrive, and SharePoint (images, sound & video files) into a list of all media uploaded or inserted. Users can insert media into the video timeline as many times as they want. Users can replace an image, sound, or video clip with another by dragging and dropping it over the target. There is also a Gap Remover tool that removes gaps in the video. Videos can be trimmed, along with timings that can be edited. The user can crop videos and images, too. Text can be added anywhere on the screen, and can be in many fonts, and the size can be changed, too. Specific text color can be selected using presets or an HSV picker, and specific Text Styles (bold, medium, italics, normal) can be selected. The aspect ratio can also be selected, including 16:9, 9:16, 1:1, 4:5, 2:3, and 21:9. Clipchamp also supports numerous effects and transitions for videos and images. The user can export videos in 480p, 720p, and 1080p for free. Exporting GIFs are possible, while the video has to be 15 seconds or less.

Microsoft Clipchamp uses a hybrid model of desktop and online application. In the personal version of Clipchamp (on Windows and in a web browser), video processing is all done locally on the computer and mobile phones, but the app itself runs online as a browser-based web app. This is done by uploading and saving project data and information like file names online but not the associated media files themselves. In the work version of Clipchamp, which is a part of Microsoft 365, media files are still processed locally but are automatically backed up to the user's OneDrive or SharePoint work or school account so that it can be accessed anywhere. This version also has integration with other Microsoft productivity services like Microsoft Teams and Microsoft Stream.

== History ==
Official icon from 2022-2025 (left); wordmark from 2020–2022 (right)

Clipchamp Pty Ltd. was founded as a startup company by Alexander Dreiling (current CEO), Dave Hewitt, Tobias Raub and Soeren Balko, in Brisbane, Australia, in 2013. In an interview given to SmartCompany, Dreiling commented that at first, the company was "trying to build an enormous, distributed supercomputer". Among the first software developed by the company's team was a tool for video compression and conversion.

2014 saw the official launch of the first version of the free, audiovisual browser-based software on the Clipchamp platform. When the supercomputer project ground to a halt, the team decided to keep going with the video programming technology, which was, in the words of Dreiling, "a tool that worked on Chromebooks".

In June 2016, the second version of Clipchamp was launched internationally. By 2018, the firm had amassed 6.5 million users. In February 2021, Clipchamp published on its website that it has 14 million users worldwide, registered in 250 countries and territories. At that time, the company announced that it had an audiovisual library of 800,000 files.

On September 7, 2021, Microsoft announced the acquisition of Clipchamp. Johnson Winter Slattery advised Microsoft on its acquisition. Clipchamp was integrated as part of Windows 11 beginning on March 9, 2022, as part of Insider Preview Build 22572.

In June 2026, Microsoft ended support for Clipchamp on iOS, with no replacement offered and no way to export videos stored in the app.

== See also ==
- Comparison of video editing software
- List of video editing software
- Windows Movie Maker
