= Wunderlist =

Discontinued task management application

- Original author: Christian Reber
- Developer: 6Wunderkinder GmbH (a subsidiary of Microsoft Corporation)
- Final release: 3.4.0 (3.4.25, 1 May 2020)
- Operating system: iOS; Android; Fire OS; Microsoft Windows; Windows Phone; macOS; ChromeOS; watchOS
- Type: Task management
- License: Freemium

Wunderlist is a discontinued cloud-based task management application. It allowed users to create lists to manage their tasks from a smartphone, tablet, computer and smartwatch. Wunderlist was free; additional collaboration features were available in a paid version known as Wunderlist Pro, released April 2013.

Wunderlist was created in 2011 by Berlin-based startup 6Wunderkinder (Engl.: 6Prodigies). The company was acquired by Microsoft in June 2015, at which time the app had over 13 million users.

In April 2017, Microsoft announced that Wunderlist would eventually be discontinued in favor of Microsoft To Do, a new multi-platform app developed by the Wunderlist team that has direct integration with the company's Office 365 service.

On December 6, 2019, Microsoft announced that it would shut down Wunderlist on May 6, 2020. After this date, the application would no longer sync but users could still import their content into Microsoft To Do.

== History ==
In 2009, Wunderlist's CEO Christian Reber called on the social network platform XING for business partners to create a new to-do app. Frank Thelen responded and together Reber and Thelen developed first concepts for Wunderlist. The necessary seed funding was granted by High-Tech Gründerfonds and e42 GmbH.

The first version of Wunderlist was launched on November 9, 2010. Initially, the program was created for desktop PCs and platforms such as Windows, Linux and Mac OS X. In December 2011, the app received approval for the iPhone. Subsequently, the developers released a version prepared for the iPad with the name Wunderlist HD.

In September 2012, the developers announced a shutdown of their service Wunderkit. Instead they wanted to focus on creating a new version of Wunderlist, which was later on released in December 2012 under the name Wunderlist 2. In September 2013, the company announced it had over 5 million users. In July 2014, a new major update was released under the name of Wunderlist 3, with a new real-time sync architecture. Wunderlist reached 10 million users in December 2014.

On June 1, 2015, it was announced that Microsoft had acquired 6Wunderkinder, makers of Wunderlist, for between US$100 million and US$200 million (~$265 million in 2025). Following its acquisition of the app, Microsoft announced in April 2017 a preview of To Do, a multi-platform task management app developed by the Wunderlist team that was intended to eventually replace Wunderlist and incorporate most of its features. As of January 2019, To-Do had not yet reached feature parity with Wunderlist, with its team citing that the service had to be completely re-written to use Microsoft Azure instead of Amazon Web Services.

Frustrated by the perceived lack of roadmap, in September 2019, Reber began to publicly ask Microsoft-related accounts on Twitter whether he could buy Wunderlist back. Shortly afterward, however, Microsoft unveiled updates to To-Do that make it more closely resemble Wunderlist.

In December 2019, Microsoft announced that it would fully shut down Wunderlist as of May 6, 2020.

The team responsible for creating Wunderlist, led by co-founder Christian Reber, created the Superlist app in early 2024.

== Finances ==
In its initial round of funding, 100,000 euro was invested in 6Wunderkinder by Frank Thelen and others. In December 2010, High-Tech Gründerfonds invested 500,000 euro (approximately US$660,000) in the company. T-Venture also invested an undisclosed amount in the startup. In its Series A round of funding in November 2011, Atomico invested $4.2 million (~$5.92 million in 2025) while High-Tech Gründerfonds invested an undisclosed additional amount.

In May 2012, High-Tech Gründerfonds sold off its stake in 6Wunderkinder to Earlybird Venture Capital. In November 2013, $19 million (~$25.9 million in 2025) was raised in a Series B round led by Sequoia Capital with participation from Earlybird and Atomico.

== Awards ==
In 2013, Wunderlist for Mac was named App of the Year. Wunderlist was selected as a Google Play Top Developer in 2013.

In 2014, Wunderlist won the "Golden Mi" award from Xiaomi, and also named as one of its Best Apps of 2014 was given a "Google Play Editor's Choice" award, and was named in Google Play's Best Apps of 2014 as well as Apple's Best of 2014.

== See also ==
- Microsoft To Do
- Microsoft mobile services
- Getting Things Done
- Sunrise Calendar
