= Microsoft 365 =

Subscription services offered by Microsoft

- Microsoft 365 app icon
- Original author: Microsoft
- Developer: Microsoft AI
- Release: July 10, 2017; 9 years ago

Stable release(s)
- macOS: 16.114.1 / October 22, 2026; 31 days ago
- Android: 16.0 (Build 20207.20014) / June 14, 2026; 5 months ago
- iOS (Note: Including iPadOS and visionOS): 2.115.2 / October 26, 2026; 27 days ago
- Operating system: Windows 10, 11; macOS 14+; Android; iOS 18, 26
- Predecessor: Microsoft Office
- Type: Software as a service contract
- Website: m365.cloud.microsoft

Microsoft 365 (previously called Office 365) is a product family of productivity software, collaboration tools, and cloud-based services developed and owned by Microsoft. It encompasses online services such as Outlook.com, OneDrive, Microsoft Teams, programs formerly marketed under the name "Microsoft Office" (including applications such as Word, Excel, PowerPoint, and Outlook on Microsoft Windows, macOS, mobile devices, and on the web), and enterprise products and services associated with these products such as Exchange Server, SharePoint, and Viva Engage. Microsoft 365 also covers subscription plans encompassing these products, including those that include subscription-based licenses to desktop and mobile software, and hosted email and intranet services.

The branding Office 365 was introduced in 2010 to refer to a subscription-based software as a service platform for the corporate market, including hosted services such as Exchange, SharePoint, and Lync Server, and Office on the web. Some plans also included licenses for the Microsoft Office 2010 software. Upon the release of Office 2013, Microsoft began to promote the service as the primary distribution model for the Microsoft Office suite, adding consumer-focused plans integrating with services such as OneDrive and Skype, and emphasizing ongoing feature updates (as opposed to non-subscription licenses, where new versions require purchase of a new license, and are feature updates in and of themselves).

In July 2017, Microsoft introduced a second brand of subscription services for the enterprise market known as Microsoft 365, combining Office 365 with Windows 10 Enterprise volume licenses and other cloud-based security and device management products. On April 21, 2020, Office 365 was renamed to Microsoft 365 to emphasize the service's current inclusion of products and services beyond the core Microsoft Office software family (including cloud-based productivity tools and artificial intelligence features). Most products under the Office 365 name were renamed to Microsoft 365 on the same day.

In October 2022, Microsoft announced that it would discontinue the "Microsoft Office" brand by January 2023, with most of its products and online productivity services being marketed primarily under the "Microsoft 365" brand. However, Microsoft continues to sell perpetually-licensed office suites under the "Microsoft Office" brand.

As of April 2025, the Microsoft 365 app and website are now called Microsoft 365 Copilot.

== History ==
=== As Office 365 ===
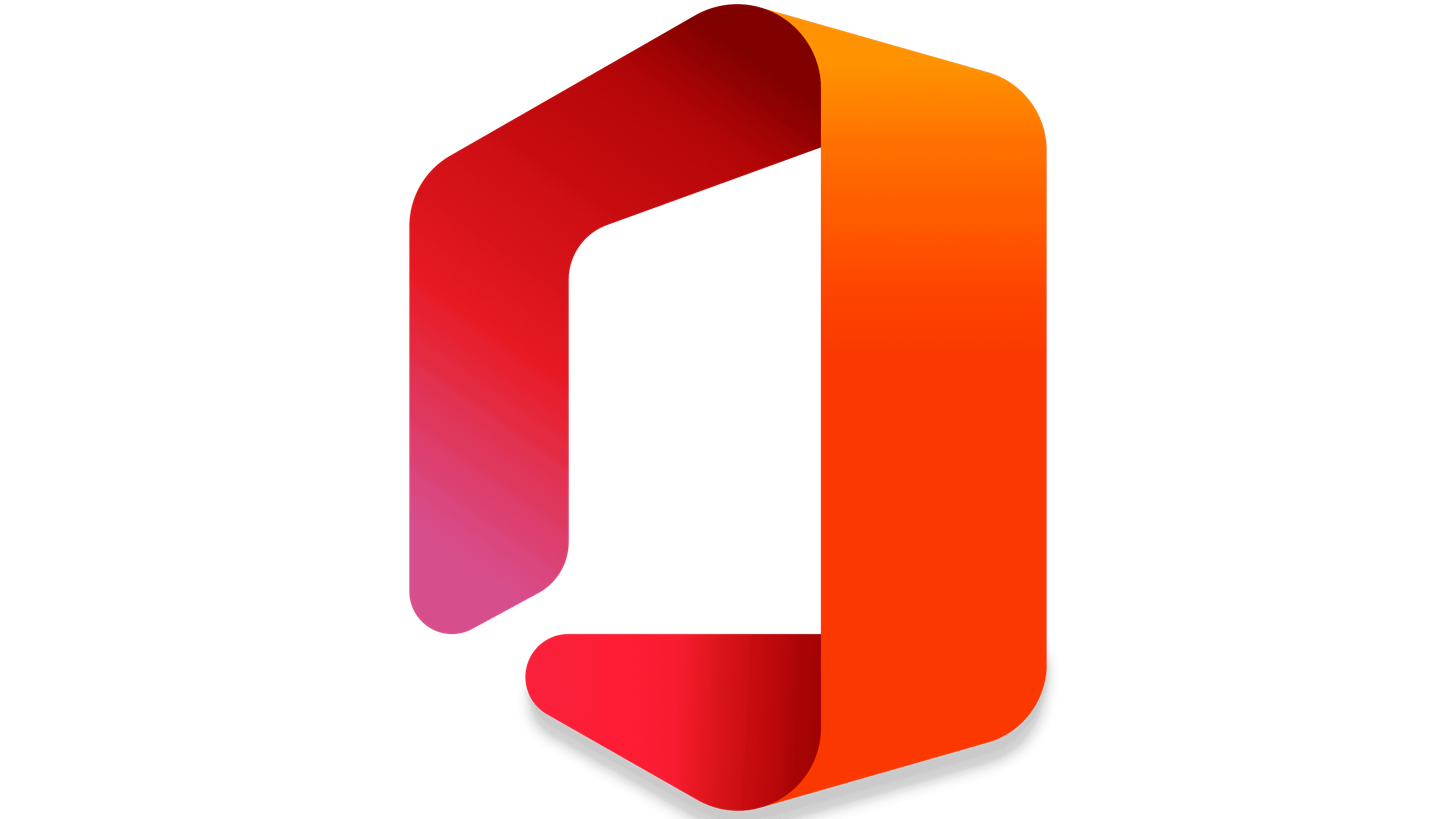
The final Office 365 logo before Microsoft's transition into the new Microsoft 365 branding.

Microsoft first announced Office 365 in October 19, 2010, beginning with a private beta with various organizations, leading into a public beta in April 18, 2011, and reaching general availability on June 28, 2011, with a launch aimed originally at corporate users. Facing growing competition from Google's similar service Google Workspace, Microsoft designed the Office 365 platform to "bring together" its existing online services (such as the Business Productivity Online Suite) into "an always-up-to-date cloud service" incorporating Exchange Server (for e-mail), SharePoint (for internal social networking, collaboration, and a public web site), and Lync (for communication, VoIP, and conferencing). Plans were initially launched for small business and enterprises; the small business plan offered Exchange e-mail, SharePoint Online, Lync Online, web hosting via SharePoint, and the Web App with the enterprise plan also adding per-user licenses for the Office 2010 Professional Plus software and 24/7 phone support. Following the official launch of the service, Business Productivity Online Suite customers were given 12 months to migrate from BPOS to the Office 365 platform.

With the release of Office 2013, an updated version of the Office 365 platform was launched on February 27, 2013, expanding Office 365 to include new plans aimed at different types of businesses, along with new plans aimed at general consumers, including benefits tailored towards Microsoft consumer services such as OneDrive (whose integration with Office was a major feature of the 2013 suite). The server components were updated to their respective 2013 versions, and Microsoft expanded the Office 365 service with new plans, such as Small Business Premium, Midsize Premium, and Pro Plus. A new Office 365 Home Premium plan aimed at home users offers access to the Office 2013 suite for up to five computers, along with expanded OneDrive storage and 60 minutes of Skype calls monthly. The plan is aimed at mainstream consumers, especially those who want to install Office on multiple computers. A University plan was introduced, targeted at post-secondary students. With these new offerings, Microsoft began to offer prepaid Office 365 subscriptions through retail outlets alongside the normal, perpetually licensed editions of Office 2013 (which are only licensed for use on one computer, and do not receive feature updates).

On March 19, 2013, Microsoft detailed its plans to provide integration with the enterprise social networking platform Yammer (which they had acquired in 2012) for Office 365, such as the ability to use a single sign-on between the two services, shared feeds and document aggregation, and the ability to entirely replace the SharePoint news feed and social functionality with Yammer. The ability to provide a link to a Yammer network from an Office 365 portal was introduced in June 2013, with heavier integration (such as a Yammer app for SharePoint and single sign-on) to be introduced in July 2013.

On July 8, 2013, Microsoft unveiled Power BI, a suite of business intelligence and self-serve data mining tools for Office 365, to be released later in the year. Power BI is primarily incorporated into Excel, allowing users to use the Power Query tool to create spreadsheets and graphs using public and private data, and also perform geovisualization with Bing Maps data using the Power Map tool (previously available as a beta plug-in known as GeoFlow). Users will also be able to access and publish reports, and perform natural language queries on data. As a limited-time offer for certain markets (but notably excluding the US), Microsoft also offered a free one-year Xbox Live Gold subscription with any purchase of an Office 365 Home Premium or University subscription, until September 28, 2013.

From April 15, 2014, Microsoft renamed the "Home Premium" plan to "Home" and added a new "Personal" plan for single users.

In June 2014, the amount of OneDrive storage offered to Office 365 subscribers was increased to 1 terabyte from 20 GB. On October 27, 2014, Microsoft announced "unlimited" OneDrive storage for Office 365 subscribers. However, due to abuse and a general reduction in storage options implemented by Microsoft, the 1 TB cap was reinstated in November 2015.

In June 2016, Microsoft made Planner available for general release. It is considered to be a competitor to Trello and to other agile team collaboration cloud services.

In April 2017, Microsoft announced that with the ending of mainstream support for Office 2016 on October 13, 2020, access to OneDrive for Business and Office 365-hosted servers for Skype for Business will become unavailable to those who are not using Office 365 ProPlus or Office perpetual in mainstream support. In July 2019, Microsoft announced that the hosted Skype for Business Online service would be discontinued on July 31, 2021, with users being redirected to the Microsoft Teams collaboration platform as its replacement. Since September 2019, Skype for Business Online is no longer offered to new subscribers.

In October 2017, the existing Outlook.com Premium service was discontinued and folded exclusively into Office 365, with all Personal and Family subscribers subsequently being upgraded to 50 GB of storage.

=== As Microsoft 365 ===
==== For businesses ====
The "Microsoft 365" brand was first introduced at Microsoft Inspire in July 2017 as an enterprise subscription product, succeeding the "Secure Productive Enterprise" services released in 2016, and combining Windows 10 Enterprise with Office 365 Business Premium, and the Enterprise Mobility + Security suite including Advanced Threat Analytics, Azure Active Directory, Azure Information Protection, Cloud App Security and Microsoft Intune. Microsoft 365 is sold via Microsoft and its cloud services reseller network.

==== Consumer launch ====
On March 30, 2020, Microsoft announced that the consumer plans of Office 365 would be rebranded as "Microsoft 365" (a brand also used by Microsoft for an enterprise subscription bundle of Windows, Office 365, and security services) on April 21, 2020, succeeding existing consumer plans of Office 365.

It is a superset of the existing Office 365 products and benefits, positioned towards "life", productivity, and families, including the Microsoft Office suite, 1 TB of additional OneDrive storage and access to OneDrive Personal Vault, and 60 minutes of Skype calls per month. Under the brand, Microsoft will also add access to its collaboration platform Teams (which will also add additional features designed around family use), and a premium tier of Microsoft Family Safety. Microsoft also announced plans to offer trial offers of third-party services for Microsoft 365 subscribers, with companies such as Adobe (Creative Cloud Photography), Blinkist, CreativeLive, Experian, and Headspace having partnered. Microsoft 365 Personal and Family succeeded the Office 365 Personal and Home subscriptions, with no change in pricing.

Office 365 for small- and medium-sized businesses was also renamed Microsoft 365, with Office 365 Business and ProPlus becoming "Microsoft 365 Apps for business" and "Microsoft 365 Apps for enterprise", Office 365 Business Essentials becoming "Microsoft 365 Business Basic", and Office 365 Business Premium becoming "Microsoft 365 Business Standard" (with the existing Microsoft 365 Business product becoming "Microsoft 365 Business Premium"). The Office 365 brand remains in use for its enterprise, education, healthcare, and governmental plans. Microsoft stated that "over the last several years, our cloud productivity offering has grown well beyond what people traditionally think of as 'Office'", citing examples such as Forms, Planner, Stream, and Teams.

On October 13, 2022, Microsoft announced that it would be phasing out the Microsoft Office brand, in favor of branding all products under the Microsoft 365 name. This change took effect on Office.com in November 2022, followed by the Office mobile apps in January 2023. The Microsoft Office brand will still be used for legacy products, including subscription products still carrying the "Office 365" name since the previous Microsoft 365 rebranding, and the "on-premises"/perpetually licensed Microsoft Office 2021.

In November 2024, Microsoft expanded the use of Copilot in Microsoft 365 apps to Microsoft 365 Personal and Home subscribers in Asia-Pacific markets, previously exclusive to Microsoft's Copilot Pro subscription. Microsoft subsequently increased the price of its consumer subscriptions to accommodate the addition of Copilot features. In December 2024, Microsoft announced that the Microsoft 365 app would be rebranded as the Microsoft 365 Copilot App in an effort to highlight the integration of Copilot features for Microsoft 365 Personal and Home subscriptions. The logo was rebranded to the Copilot logo with an "M365" tag.

Logo used for the Microsoft 365 Copilot app

In March 2025, Microsoft announced that it would bring Copilot for OneDrive to Microsoft 365 Personal and Home subscriptions. Copilot for OneDrive allows consumers to use Copilot to interact with their files stored in OneDrive.

== Software and services ==
=== Desktop applications ===
The Microsoft 365 desktop applications (formerly marketed as Microsoft Office) are primarily used on personal computers running Microsoft Windows, and are distributed as part of the Microsoft 365 subscription. They are installed using a "click-to-run" system which allows users to begin using the applications almost instantaneously, while files are downloaded in the background. Updates to the software are installed automatically, covering both security and feature updates. These applications were one of the core components of the initial Office 365 service. If the user's subscription lapses, the applications enter a read-only mode where editing functionality is disabled. Full functionality is restored once a new subscription is purchased and activated.

Although there are still "on-premises" or "perpetual" releases of Office released on a three-year cycle, these versions do not receive new features or access to new cloud-based services as they are released on Microsoft 365.

All of these applications, excluding Access and Publisher, are also available on macOS.

- Microsoft Word is a word processing application for editing documents.
- Microsoft Excel is a spreadsheet editor.
- Microsoft PowerPoint is a presentation program.
- Microsoft OneNote is a notetaking program that gathers handwritten or typed notes, drawings, screen clippings and audio commentaries. Notes can be shared with other OneNote users over the Internet or a network.
- Microsoft Outlook is a personal information manager (PIM) that includes an e-mail client, calendar, task manager and address book.
- Microsoft Publisher is a desktop publishing app for Windows mostly used for designing brochures, labels, calendars, greeting cards, business cards, newsletters, web sites, and postcards.
- Microsoft Access is a database management system for Windows that combines the relational Access Database Engine (formerly Jet Database Engine) with a graphical user interface and software development tools. Microsoft Access stores data in its own format based on the Access Database Engine. It can also import or link directly to data stored in other applications and databases.

Current applications are:

Product name	Release date	PC app	Mobile app	Mac app
Access	November 1992	Yes	No	No
Excel	1987	Yes	Yes	Yes
OneNote	November 19, 2003	Yes	Yes	Yes
Outlook	January 16, 1997	Yes	Yes	Yes
PowerPoint	May 22, 1990	Yes	Yes	Yes
Power BI	July 11, 2011	Yes	Yes	No (Note: Supports using the Visio iOS application, which only allows viewing.)
Sway	2014	Yes	Yes	No
Word	October 25, 1983	Yes	Yes	Yes
Forms	June 20, 2016	No	Yes	No
Bookings	July 20, 2016	No	Yes	Yes
Office Online	June 7, 2010	No	Yes	No
OneDrive	August 1, 2007	Yes	Yes	Yes
Outlook.com	July 4, 1996	No	Yes	No
Planner	June 6, 2016	No	Yes	Yes
Clipchamp (formerly Stream)	June 20, 2017	No	Yes	Yes
Teams	November 2, 2016	Yes	Yes	Yes
SharePoint	March 28, 2001	Yes	Yes	Yes
To Do	April 2017	Yes	Yes	Yes
Viva Engage (formerly Yammer)	March 10, 2008	Yes	Yes	Yes
Microsoft Lists	July 20, 2020	Yes	Yes	No
Clipchamp	2013	Yes	No	No
Fluid Framework	TBA	TBA	TBA	TBA
Project Cortex	TBA	TBA	TBA	TBA

Discontinued applications are:

Name	Release date	Discontinued
Delve	March 2015	December 2024
Microsoft Binder	August 24, 1995	August 19, 2003
Microsoft Classroom	April 14, 2016	January 31, 2018
Microsoft Clip Organizer	2000	2013
Docs.com	April 21, 2010	December 15, 2017
Microsoft Data Analyzer	May 31, 2001	January 30, 2007
Microsoft Encarta	1993	2009
Microsoft Entourage	October 2000	January 15, 2008
Microsoft Equation Editor	August 19, 2003	June 15, 2010
Microsoft Exchange Client	January 30, 2007	June 15, 2010
Microsoft Expression Web	December 4, 2006	December 20, 2012
Microsoft FrontPage	August 24, 1995	January 30, 2007
Gigjam Preview	2016	September 22, 2017
Microsoft InfoPath	August 19, 2003	September 22, 2015
Microsoft InterConnect (Japan only)	2004	2009
Microsoft Mail	1988	August 24, 2001
Microsoft MapPoint	June 7, 1999	July 2012
Microsoft Mathematics (formerly Microsoft Math)	2006	2021
Microsoft Office Accounting	August 19, 2003	November 16, 2009
Microsoft Office Document Imaging	August 19, 2003	June 15, 2010
Microsoft Office Document Scanning	August 19, 2003	June 15, 2010
Microsoft Office Live	2007	2010
Microsoft Office Live Meeting	2007	December 31, 2017
Microsoft Office Mix	2014	May 1, 2018
Microsoft Office PerformancePoint Server	November 2007	2009
Microsoft Office Picture Manager	August 19, 2003	July 16, 2013
Microsoft Office Project Portfolio Server	2006	June 15, 2010
Microsoft Outlook Hotmail Connector	August 19, 2003	January 29, 2013
Microsoft PhotoDraw	June 7, 1999	May 31, 2001
Microsoft Photo Editor	November 19, 1996	August 19, 2003
Microsoft Schedule+	1992	November 19, 1996
Microsoft Search Server	November 7, 2007	January 29, 2013
Microsoft SharePoint Designer	January 30, 2007	August 2, 2016
Microsoft SharePoint Foundation	2001	2013
Microsoft SharePoint Workspace (formerly Microsoft Office Groove)	January 30, 2007	January 29, 2013
Microsoft Vizact	April 1, 2000	April 1, 2000
Office Assistant	November 19, 1996	January 30, 2007
Office Web Components	June 7, 1999	January 30, 2007
Skype	August 29, 2003	May 5, 2025

=== Mobile and web applications ===
Word, Excel, and PowerPoint are available as mobile and web apps, usable for free with limitations, although they do not contain all of the functionality as the desktop versions. The mobile apps were originally limited to Office 365 subscribers, but basic editing and document creation has since been made free for personal use. An active Microsoft 365 subscription is still required to unlock certain advanced editing features, use the apps on devices with screens larger than 10.1 inches, or to use the apps for commercial purposes. In February 2020, Microsoft introduced a new Microsoft Office app that integrates Word, Excel, and PowerPoint, replacing the previous, separate apps for each.

Microsoft Outlook for mobile is derived from the apps Acompli and Sunrise Calendar, which were acquired by Microsoft and discontinued.

=== Online services and apps ===
Some Microsoft 365 online services are usable without a subscription, but with limitations such as advertising and lower storage limits.

- Outlook.com, an online webmail service originally launched as Hotmail, also including an address book (People) and calendar.
- OneDrive, an online file storage service.
- Microsoft Copilot: artificial intelligence features, including AI assistant and generative AI.
- Office on the web, cloud-based versions of Word, Excel, and PowerPoint; they compete primarily with services such as Google Docs.
- Microsoft Teams, a business communication platform.
- To Do, a task management app.
- Clipchamp, an online video editor.
- Skype, an instant messaging and VOIP service.
- Microsoft Family Safety is a service encompassing parental controls that can be used across Windows, Android, iOS, and Xbox devices for web filtering, time limits, location sharing, and other features.

=== Enterprise servers and services ===
Business and enterprise-oriented plans for Microsoft/Office 365 offer access to cloud-hosted server platforms on a software as a service basis, including Exchange, Skype for Business, SharePoint, Microsoft Dictate (speech recognition), and Office on the web. Through SharePoint's OneDrive for Business functionality (formerly known as SharePoint MySites and SkyDrive Pro, and distinct from the consumer-oriented OneDrive service), each user also receives 1 TB of online storage. Certain plans also include unlimited personal cloud storage per user.

Microsoft 365 services can be configured through an online portal; users can be added manually, imported from a CSV file, or set up for single sign-on with a local Active Directory using Active Directory Federation Services. More advanced setup and features requires the use of PowerShell scripts.

- Exchange Server, a mail and calendaring server.
- SharePoint is a web-based collaborative platform. It is primarily sold as a document management and storage system, but the product is highly configurable and usage varies substantially among organizations.
- Microsoft Power Platform is a line of business intelligence, app development, and app connectivity applications.
- Microsoft Viva, an "employee experience platform", including Viva Engage, an enterprise social networks service.

Current server applications are:

Name	Release date
Microsoft Exchange Server: Outlook on the web	April 11, 1996: 1997
Microsoft Project Server	2000
Office Web Apps Server	—N/a
SharePoint: Excel Services; InfoPath Forms Services	March 28, 2001: 2010; November 19, 2003
Skype for Business Server	December 29, 2003

== Subscription plans ==
Microsoft 365 offers subscription plans aimed at different needs and market segments, providing different sets of features at different price points. Microsoft has also offered Office 365 subscriptions to students of institutions who have licensed Office software for their faculty. There are two separate backends for the products:

- Consumer plans log in using a Microsoft account, also called a "personal account".
- Business, enterprise and education plans log in using a user ID managed by Azure Active Directory, also called a "work or school account"

=== Consumer ===
Aimed at mainstream consumers, both plans offer access to Microsoft Office applications (Word, Excel, PowerPoint, Outlook, Publisher, and Access) for home/non-commercial use on one computer (Windows, macOS, and mobile devices), with access to additional online-based services and premium creative content, 1 TB of OneDrive storage with Advanced Security, 60 minutes of Skype international calls per month (subject to area), and partner offers.

- Microsoft 365 Personal (formerly Office 365 Personal): Includes access to Word, Excel, PowerPoint, Outlook, Publisher, and Access for home/non-commercial use on up to five computers, phones or tablets (Windows, Mac, Android, iOS). Additional benefits include 1 TB of additional OneDrive storage and 60 minutes of Skype international calls per month (subject to area). A version of Personal purchased on a discounted four-year plan, known as Office 365 University, allowing use on two devices by one user, was available for those in post-secondary institutions until 2019.
- Microsoft 365 Family (formerly Office 365 Home): Aimed at mainstream consumers and families; same as Personal, but for use on up to five devices per person by up to six users.
- Microsoft 365 Personal Classic/Family Classic: Similar to the standard Personal and Family plans, but with a lack of AI credits or AI-powered features, such as Microsoft Copilot or Microsoft Designer.

=== Small Business ===
- Microsoft 365 Apps for business (formerly Office 365 Business): Offers Office applications for Windows, Mac, and mobile platforms for up to five computers, tablets, and smartphones per user.
- Microsoft 365 Business Basic (formerly Office 365 Business Essentials) is suitable for small and medium-sized businesses. It includes Office 365 web-apps: Word, Excel, Outlook, PowerPoint, OneNote, as well as Exchange, Teams, SharePoint, OneDrive, Forms and Visio with 1 TB.
- Microsoft 365 Business Standard (formerly Office 365 Business Premium) includes Microsoft 365 Business Basic and Microsoft 365 Apps for Business.
- Microsoft 365 Business Premium (formerly Microsoft 365 Business) is for businesses with up to 300 employees. It includes Microsoft 365 Business Standard and additionally: Windows 10 Business, Azure Virtual Desktop, Azure AD P1, Microsoft Intune, Defender for Business, Defender for Office 365.

=== Enterprise ===
- Microsoft 365 Apps for Enterprise (formerly Office 365 ProPlus)
- Office 365 Enterprise: Intended for use in corporate environments. Provides access to all Office applications and hosted services, as well as business-specific features and regulatory compliance support.
- Microsoft 365 Enterprise: A bundle of Office 365 Enterprise, Windows 10 Enterprise and Enterprise Mobility + Security.

=== Education ===
- Microsoft 365 Education

=== Other ===
- Office 365 operated by 21Vianet: Microsoft has licensed 21Vianet to provide Office 365 services to its China customers. Microsoft does not operate Office 365 in China; instead, 21Vianet does. The service differs in features from the service offered elsewhere.

=== Comparison ===
Microsoft 365 Editions
Features	Private			Business				Enterprise				Education			Frontline	
Features	Office Online	Personal/Personal Classic	Family/Family Classic	Apps	Standard	Premium	Basic	Apps	E1	E3	E5	A1	A3	A5	F1	F3
Devices per user (PC/Tablet/Smartphone)		max. 5	5/5/5	5/5/5	5/5/5	5/5/5	-/5/5	5/5/5	–/5/5	5/5/5	5/5/5	–/5/5	5/5/5	5/5/5	–/5/5	–/5/5
Max. Users	1	1	6	300	300	300	300	unlimited	unlimited	unlimited	unlimited	unlimited	unlimited	unlimited	unlimited	unlimited
commercial use	No	No	No	Yes	Yes	Yes	Yes	Yes	Yes	Yes	Yes	No	No	No	Yes	Yes
Skype-Free minutes worldwide	No	60 60 mins / month	60 60 mins / month	No	No	No	No	No	No	No	No	No	No	No	No	No
Email inbox size	15 GB	50 GB	50 GB		50 GB	50 GB	50 GB		50 GB	100 GB	100 GB	50 GB	100 GB	100 GB	2 GB	2 GB
OneDrive-storage	5 GB	1 TB	1 TB	1 TB	1 TB	1 TB	1 TB	unlimited	1 TB	unlimited	unlimited	unlimited	unlimited	unlimited	2 GB	2 GB
Word	Web app only	Yes	Yes	Yes	Yes	Yes	Web app only	Yes	Web app only	Yes	Yes	Web app only	Yes	Yes	Web app only	Web app only
Excel	Web app only	Yes	Yes	Yes	Yes	Yes	Web app only	Yes	Web app only	Yes	Yes	Web app only	Yes	Yes	Web app only	Web app only
PowerPoint	Web app only	Yes	Yes	Yes	Yes	Yes	Web app only	Yes	Web app only	Yes	Yes	Web app only	Yes	Yes	Web app only	Web app only
OneNote	Web app only	Yes	Yes	Yes	Yes	Yes	Web app only	Yes	Web app only	Yes	Yes	Web app only	Yes	Yes	Web app only	Web app only
Outlook	Web app only	Yes	Yes	Yes	Yes	Yes	Web app only	Yes	Web app only	Yes	Yes	Web app only	Yes	Yes	Web app only	Web app only
Publisher	No	Yes	Yes	Yes	Yes	Yes	No	Yes	No	Yes	Yes	No	Yes	Yes	No	Yes
Access	No	Yes	Yes	Yes	Yes	Yes	No	Yes	No	Yes	Yes	No	Yes	Yes	No	Yes
Sway	Yes	Yes	Yes	Yes	Yes	Yes	Yes	Yes	Yes	Yes	Yes	Yes	Yes	Yes	Yes	Yes
Skype for Business	No	No	No	No	No	Yes	Yes	No	Yes	Yes	Yes	Yes	Yes	Yes	No	No
Viva Engage	No	No	No	No	No	No	No	No	Yes	Yes	Yes	No	No	No	Yes	Yes
SharePoint	No	No	No	No	Yes	Yes	Yes	No	Yes	Yes	Yes	Yes	Yes	Yes	Yes	Yes
Exchange	No	No	No	No	Yes	Yes	Yes	No	Yes	Yes	Yes	Yes	Yes	Yes	Yes	Yes
Microsoft Teams	No	No	No	No	Yes	Yes	Yes	No	Yes	Yes	Yes	Yes	Yes	Yes	Yes	Yes
Microsoft Planner	No	No	No	No	Yes	Yes	Yes	No	Yes	Yes	Yes	No	No	No	No	Yes
StaffHub	No	No	No	No	No	Yes	No	No	Yes	Yes	Yes	Yes	Yes	Yes	Yes	Yes
Power BI Pro	No	No	No	No	No	No	No	No	No	No	Yes	No	No	Yes	No	No
Forms	No	Yes	Yes	No	No	No	No	No	No	No	No	Yes	Yes	Yes	No	Yes
Stream	No	No	No	No	No	Yes	No	No	Yes	Yes	Yes	Yes	Yes	Yes	Yes	Yes
Power Automate	No	Yes	Yes	No	Yes	Yes	Yes	No	No	Yes	Yes	Yes	Yes	Yes	Yes	Yes
PowerApps	No	No	No	No	No	No	No	No	No	Yes	Yes	Yes	Yes	Yes	No	Yes
School Data Sync	No	No	No	No	No	No	No	No	No	No	No	Yes	Yes	Yes	No	No
Bookings	No	No	No	No	Yes	Yes	No	No	No	Yes	Yes	No	Yes	Yes	No	Yes
Clipchamp	No	Yes	Yes	No	No	No	No	No	No	No	No	No	No	No	No	No

== Security ==
In December 2011, Microsoft announced that the Office 365 platform was now compliant with the ISO/IEC 27001 security standards, the European Union's Data Protection Directive (through the signing of model clauses), and the Health Insurance Portability and Accountability Act for health care environments in the United States. At the same time, Microsoft also unveiled a new "Trust Center" portal, containing further information on its privacy policies and security practices for the service. In May 2012, Microsoft announced that Office 365 was now compliant with the Federal Information Security Management Act; compliance with the act would now allow Office 365 to be used by U.S. government agencies.

In spite of claiming to comply with European data protection standards, and in spite of existing Safe Harbor agreements, Microsoft has admitted that it will not refrain from handing over data stored on its European servers to US authorities under the Patriot Act.

In Finland, FICORA has warned Office 365 users of phishing incidents and break-ins that have caused losses of millions of euros. In September 2019, NCSC-FI (National Cyber Security Centre of Finland) created a detailed guide on how to protect Microsoft Office 365 against phishing attempts and any data breaches.

In July 2019, the German state of Hesse outlawed the use of Office 365 in educational institutions, citing privacy risks. Denmark's Ministry of Digital Affairs will phase out Windows and Office 365 by November 2025.

In December 2020, the US Department of Commerce was breached via Office 365. The attackers were able to access staff emails for several months.

A July 1, 2021 cybersecurity advisory from British (NCSC) and American (NSA, FBI, CISA) security agencies warned of a GRU brute-force campaign from mid-2019 to the present (July 2021) that focused a "significant amount" of activity on Microsoft Office 365 cloud services.

On November 10, 2023, IT news portal Heise online disclosed that "if you try out the new Outlook, you risk transferring your IMAP and SMTP credentials of mail accounts and all your emails to Microsoft servers."

== Outages ==
On March 1, 2025, Microsoft experienced a global outage. All Microsoft products were down for a few hours.

On November 12, 2026, and continuing into November 13, a global outage in the 365 suite, outlook and teams resulted in over 130,000 users in at least 74 countries reporting problems accessing software. Copilot was also affected. Microsoft posted on X, saying that its infrastructure experienced "elevated load" after a large number of servers became unexpectedly unavailable.

== Reception ==
TechRadar gave the 2013 update of Office 365 a 4.5 out of 5, praising its administration interfaces for being accessible to users with any level of expertise, the seamless integration of OneDrive Pro into the Office 2013 desktop applications, and the service as a whole for being suitable in small business environments, while still offering "powerful" options for use in larger companies (such as data loss protection and the ability to integrate with a local Active Directory instance). However, the service was severely criticized for how it handled its 2013 update for existing users, and its lack of integration with services such as Skype and Viva Engage.

In the fourth quarter of fiscal year 2017, Office 365 revenue exceeded that of conventional license sales of Microsoft Office software for the first time.

== See also ==
- Comparison of office suites
- List of office suites
- Windows 365
- Google Workspace
- Microsoft Intune
- Microsoft Designer
- Software as a Service
