= Skaylink =

- Type: Privately held company
- Industry: Information technology, cloud services
- Founded: March 2020
- Headquarters: Munich, Germany
- Key people: Frank Strecker (CEO)
- Revenue: €100 million (2022)
- Owner: Before October 2025 - Waterland Private Equity Investments; Since October 2025 - Vodafone
- Number of employees: 550
- Subsidiaries: DrVis Software GmbH, Garching (Munich); Skaylink SRL (formerly Beck et al. Services SRL), Cluj-Napoca (Romania); Skaylink Ltda. (formerly Beck et al. Serviços de Informática Ltda.) Florianópolis (Brazil); Beck et al. Services AG, Urdorf (Switzerland); UAB BTT Group, Vilnius (Lithuania); cVation A/S, Copenhagen (Denmark)
- Website: https://www.skaylink.com/

Skaylink or Skaylink.com is a cloud-services company specializing in digital transformation and cloud computing technologies. As of 2023 Skaylink has 11 locations, with eight in Germany and additional offices in Romania, Brazil, Denmark, and Lithuania.

== History ==
The company was founded in 2020, but its roots can be traced back to four IT companies, Beck et al. GmbH, binary GmbH, direkt gruppe GmbH, and infoWAN Datenkommunikation GmbH.

In 2019 the founders of these four companies envisioned creating a cloud enterprise that could support medium-sized and large enterprises throughout their entire cloud journey. With the support of Waterland Private Equity, Skaylink was established in March 2020, bringing together the founding companies under one umbrella.

In July–December 2021 AWS expert root360, BTT Cloud, and cVation were acquired by Skaylink.

Skaylink operates in Germany, Austria, Switzerland, the Nordics, and Baltics, focusing on industries like finance, automotive and manufacturing. It specializes in cloud technologies including AWS, Microsoft Azure, Microsoft 365 and operates private clouds through their data centers.

In October of 2025 Waterland sold their stakes of Skaylink to Vodafone.
