= MSOL =

MSOL may stand for:

- Master of Science in Organizational Leadership, a business degree
- Microsoft Online Services
- Monadic second-order logic, a form of logic in which one can quantify over sets
- Msol or solar mass, also written as $M_{\odot}$, a unit of mass used in astronomy
- MSOL1 and MSOL2, codes for two Dungeons & Dragons modules
