= 21Vianet =

Chinese Internet and data center service provider

21Vianet Group
- Type: Public
- Traded as: Nasdaq: VNET
- Industry: Internet data center services provider
- Founded: 1996; 30 years ago Beijing, China
- Founders: Sheng Chen
- Headquarters: Beijing, China
- Area served: China
- Key people: Sheng Chen
- Services: Web hosting; Internet data center services; Microsoft Office; Microsoft Office 365; Microsoft Skype for Business Online; Microsoft Azure; Microsoft Exchange Online; Microsoft OneDrive for Business
- Website: www.vnet.com

VNET Group, Inc. (VNET, formerly 21Vianet) is the largest private, carrier-neutral Internet and data center service provider in China. A Cayman Islands holding company, VNET provides value-added telecommunications services in China through four domestic PRC companies: VNET Technology, BJ iJoy, WiFire Network, and SH Zhiyan. It is the exclusive operator of Microsoft Azure and Microsoft 365 services in China, and also houses data centers for Alibaba and other Chinese companies.
