= Microsoft Stream =

Software

- Developer: Microsoft
- Release: June 20, 2017; 9 years ago
- Successor: Microsoft Clipchamp
- Type: Video hosting service
- Website: www.microsoft.com/en/microsoft-365/microsoft-stream

Microsoft Stream was a corporate video-sharing service which was released on June 20, 2017, that replaced the existing Office 365 Video.

In 2021 Microsoft announced Stream would be re-platformed onto SharePoint and fully integrated into Office 365. Several new capabilities were announced and introduced during 2021 and 2022. These include new Stream web and mobile apps, integration of videos into Microsoft Search, automatic transcription in multiple languages, viewer analytics and video chapters.

On August 7, 2024, Microsoft migrated Stream into SharePoint and deprecated the older version, known as Stream (Classic).

== See also ==
- Microsoft mobile services
- MSN Soapbox
- Bing Videos
