= Microsoft To Do =

Cloud based task management application

Stable release(s) [±]
- Windows: 2.179 (Build 8901) / November 17, 2026; 4 days ago
- macOS: 2.177 / July 6, 2026; 4 months ago
- Android: 2.168.995.02 / April 2, 2026; 7 months ago
- iOS: 2.177 / July 6, 2026; 4 months ago
- Operating system: Windows 10+; macOS Ventura+; Android 8+; iOS 17+
- Successor: Microsoft Planner
- Type: Productivity; task management
- License: Freeware
- Website: www.microsoft.com/en/microsoft-365/microsoft-to-do-list-app

Microsoft To Do (previously styled as Microsoft To-Do) is a cloud-based task management application. It allows users to manage their tasks from a smartphone, tablet and computer. The technology is produced by the team behind Wunderlist, which was acquired by Microsoft, and the stand-alone apps feed into the existing Tasks feature of the Outlook product range.

Microsoft To Do is set to be discontinued on June 30, 2027, to be replaced by Microsoft Planner.

== History ==
Microsoft To Do was first launched as a preview with basic features in April 2017. Later more features were added including Task list sharing in June 2018.

In September 2019, a major update to the app was unveiled, adopting a new user interface with a closer resemblance to Wunderlist. The name was also slightly updated by removing the hyphen from To-Do.

In May 2020, Microsoft officially closed the doors on Wunderlist, ending its active service in favor of improving and expanding Microsoft To Do.

In November 2026, Microsoft announced that Microsoft To Do would be retired on June 30, 2027, in favor of Microsoft Planner for business and school accounts. No replacement is being offered for personal accounts, with Microsoft suggesting that users transition to third-party task management applications.

== See also ==
- Wunderlist
