= Microsoft Office 2013 =

Version of Microsoft Office released in 2013

- Clockwise from top left: Word, Excel, Outlook and PowerPoint
- Developer: Microsoft
- Release: January 29, 2013; 13 years ago
- Stable release: Service Pack 1 (15.0.5603.1000) / November 7, 2023; 3 years ago
- Operating system: Windows 7 or later Windows Server 2008 R2 or later
- Platform: IA-32, x64, ARM
- Predecessor: Microsoft Office 2010 (2010)
- Successor: Microsoft Office 2016 (2015)
- Available in: 40 languages
- List of languages English, Arabic, Bulgarian, Chinese (Simplified), Chinese, Croatian, Czech, Danish, Dutch, Estonian, Finnish, French, German, Greek, Hebrew, Hindi, Hungarian, Indonesian, Italian, Japanese, Kazakh, Korean, Latvian, Lithuanian, Malay, Norwegian (Bokmål), Polish, Portuguese (Brazil), Portuguese (Portugal), Romanian, Russian, Serbian (Latin), Slovak, Slovenian, Spanish, Swedish, Thai, Turkish, Ukrainian, Vietnamese
- Type: Office suite
- License: Proprietary and trialware OneNote: Freemium (since 2014)
- Website: Microsoft Office 2013 (Archived at Wayback Machine)

Microsoft Office 2013 (codenamed Office 15) is a version of Microsoft Office, a productivity suite for Microsoft Windows. Unlike with Office 2010, no macOS equivalent was released.

Microsoft Office 2013 includes extended file format support, user interface updates and support for touch among its new features and is suitable for IA-32 and x64 systems.

Office 2013 is compatible with Windows 7 and Windows Server 2008 R2 through Windows 11 RTM and Windows Server 2022. A version of Office 2013 comes included on RT devices. It is the last version of Microsoft Office to run on Windows 7 RTM and Windows Server 2008 R2 RTM.

Development on this version of Microsoft Office was started in 2010 and ended on October 11, 2012, when Microsoft Office 2013 was released to manufacturing. Microsoft released Office 2013 to general availability on January 29, 2013. This version includes new features such as integration support for online services (including OneDrive, Outlook.com, Skype, Viva Engage and Flickr), improved format support for Office Open XML (OOXML), OpenDocument (ODF) and Portable Document Format (PDF) and support for multi-touch interfaces.

Microsoft Office 2013 comes in twelve different editions, including three editions for retail outlets, two editions for volume licensing channel, five subscription-based editions available through Microsoft Office 365 program, the web application edition known as Office Web Apps and the Office RT edition made for tablets and mobile devices. Office Web Apps are available free of charge on the web although enterprises may obtain on-premises installations for a price. Microsoft Office applications may be obtained individually; this includes Microsoft Visio, Microsoft Project and Microsoft SharePoint Designer which are not included in any of the twelve editions.

Service Pack 1 (SP1) was released on February 25, 2014. Support for the original release (RTM) ended on April 14, 2015, and Service Pack 1 is required for receiving updates and support. Support for Office 2013 ended on April 11, 2023.

On June 9, 2018, Microsoft announced that its forums would no longer include Office 2013 or other products in extended support among its products for discussions involving support. On August 27, 2021, Microsoft announced that Microsoft Outlook 2013 SP1 with all subsequent updates will be required to connect to Microsoft 365 Exchange servers by November 1, 2021; Outlook 2013 without SP1 will no longer be supported.

Office 2013 removed support for processors without PAE, SSE2 and NX and is also the final version of Microsoft Office that supports processors without PrefetchW, LAHF and SAHF. Its successor, Office 2016, requires a processor with PrefetchW, LAHF and SAHF in any supported architecture. It is also the final version of Microsoft Office to receive a Service Pack from Microsoft.

Despite the end of support for Office 2013 in April 2023, monthly security patches for the Office suite programs was available until November 2023.

== Development ==
Development started in 2010 while Microsoft was finishing work on Office 14, released as Microsoft Office 2010. On January 30, 2012, Microsoft released a technical preview of Office 15, build 3612.1010, to a selected group of testers bound by non-disclosure agreements.

On July 16, 2012, Microsoft held a press conference to showcase Office 2013 and to release the Consumer Preview. The Office 2013 Consumer Preview is a free, fully functional version but expired 60 days after the final product's release. An update was issued for the Office 2013 Customer Preview suite on October 5.

Office 2013 was released to manufacturing on October 11, 2012. It was made available to TechNet and MSDN subscribers on October 24, 2012. On November 15, 2012, 60-days trial versions of Microsoft Office 2013 Professional Plus, Project Professional 2013 and Visio Professional 2013 were made available to the public over the Internet. Microsoft has released Office 2013 for general availability on January 29, 2013. Microsoft released the Service Pack 1 update on February 25, 2014.

== Features ==
=== New features ===
Office 2013 introduces Click-To-Run 2.0 installation technology for all editions based on Microsoft App-V Version 5. Previously, only certain editions of Office 2010 were available with Click-To-Run 1.0 installer technology, which was based on App-V 4.x, where a separate Q drive was created and installed files of Office were isolated from the rest of the system, causing many Office add-ins to not be compatible. With the newer Click-To-Run technology, Office 2013 installs files just like Windows Installer (MSI) to the Program Files directory. Retail versions of Office 2013 use the Click-to-Run installer. Volume-licensed versions use Windows Installer (MSI) technology. Some editions like Professional Plus are available in both retail (C2R) and volume (MSI) channels.

Office 2013 is more cloud-based than previous versions; a domain login, Office 365 account, or Microsoft account can now be used to sync Office application settings (including recent documents) between devices, and users can also save documents directly to their OneDrive account.

Microsoft Office 2013 includes updated support for ISO/IEC 29500, the International Standard version of Office Open XML (OOXML) file format: in particular it supports saving in the "Strict" profile of ISO/IEC 29500 (Office Open XML Strict). It also supports OASIS version 1.2 of ISO/IEC 26300:2006, Open Document Format, which Office 2013 can read and write. Additionally, Office 2013 provides full read, write, and edit support for ISO 32000 (PDF).

New features include a new read mode in Microsoft Word, a presentation mode in Microsoft PowerPoint and improved touch and inking in all of the Office programs. Microsoft Word can also insert video and audio from online sources as well as the capability to broadcast documents on the Web. Word and PowerPoint also have bookmark-like features which sync the position of the document between different computers.

The Office Web Apps suite was also updated for Office 2013, introducing additional editing features and interface changes.

Other features of Office 2013 include:

- PDF Import feature in Microsoft Word
- Improved text wrapping and improved Track Changes feature in Microsoft Word
- Flash Fill in Microsoft Excel
- Office Remote/Microsoft PowerPoint Remote app and Office add-in to control presentations from a Windows Phone or Android phone.
- Automatic slide resizing/refit in Microsoft PowerPoint
- New Office Open XML-based format, VSDX for Microsoft Visio
- Flatter look of the Ribbon interface and subtle animations when typing or selecting (Word and Excel)
- Band in application color at bottom of each screen
- A new visualization for scheduled tasks in Microsoft Outlook
- Remodeled start screen
- New graphical options in Word
- Objects such as images can be freely moved; they snap to boundaries such as paragraph edges, document margin and or column boundaries
- Supports embedding of Online picture support with content from Office.com, Bing.com and Flickr (by default, only images in public domain) to in replacement to the cliparts gallery from previews office versions.
- Ability to return to the last viewed or edited location in Word and PowerPoint
- New slide designs, animations and transitions in PowerPoint 2013
- Support for Outlook.com and Hotmail.com in Outlook
- Support for integration with Skype, Yammer and SkyDrive
- IMAP special folders support
- Starting with Office 2013, proofing tools are separately and freely downloadable without being bundled in Multilingual User Interface (MUI)/Multilanguage packs, Language Interface Packs (LIPs) or Single Language Packs (SLP).
- Excel 2013 supports new limit models, as follows:

Quantifiable limits in objects
Object	Upper limit
Characters in a table or column name	100 characters
Number of tables in a model	2,147,483,647 bytes (2 GB minus 1 byte)
Number of columns and calculated columns in a table	2,147,483,647 bytes (2 GB minus 1 byte)
Memory limit, checked when saving a workbook	4,294,967,296 bytes (4 GB)
Concurrent requests per workbook	6
Number of connections	5
Number of distinct values in a column	1,999,999,997
Number of rows in a table	1,999,999,997
String length	536,870,912 bytes (512 MB)

Restrictions in objects
Category	Details
Reserved characters that cannot be used in a Name^{1}	. , ; ' ` : / \ * | ? " & % $ ! + = () [] {} < >

Remarks

^{1} "Name", in this context, is a form of variable in Microsoft Excel

=== Removed features ===
The following features were removed from Microsoft Office 2013.

Removed from the entire suite

- Microsoft SharePoint Workspace
- Microsoft Clip Organizer
- Microsoft Office Picture Manager
- Office 2007 and Office 2010 chart styles
- Ability to insert a 3D cone, pyramid, or cylinder chart (It is still possible to insert a 3D rectangle chart and change the shape after insertion.)
- Only basic version of help files available while offline. There is no longer an option to install local help files during installation.

Features removed from Microsoft Word

- Custom XML markup has been removed for legal reasons
- Older WordArt objects are now converted to new WordArt objects
- Word 2013 no longer uses ClearType

Features removed from Microsoft Excel

- Simultaneous open files via Multiple Document Interface (MDI), along with requisite changes to VBA code to no longer support MDI; Excel is now Single Document Interface (SDI) only

Features removed from Microsoft Access

- Access Data Projects (ADP)
- Support for Jet 3.x IISAM
- Access OWC control
- dBASE support suite

Features removed from Microsoft Outlook

- Download Headers Only mode for IMAP
- Outlook Exchange Classic offline
- Microsoft Exchange Server 2003 support
- Public Folder Free/Busy feature (/Cleanfreebusy startup switch)
- Ability to import from or export to any formats other than Personal Storage Table (PST) or comma-separated values (CSV)
- Notes and Journal customization
- Outlook Activities tab
- Outlook Mobile Service (OMS)
- Outlook Search through Windows Shell

Features removed from Microsoft PowerPoint

- Support for Visio Drawing

== Changes ==
=== Distribution changes ===
Unlike past versions of Office, retail copies of Office 2013 on DVD are only offered in select regions, such as those Microsoft classifies as emerging markets, as well as Australia, at the discretion of retailers. In all other regions, retail copies of Office 2013 and Office 365 subscriptions only contain a product key, and direct users to the Office website to redeem their license and download the software.

=== Licensing changes ===
The original license agreement for retail editions of Microsoft Office 2013 was different from the license agreements of retail editions of previous versions of Microsoft Office in two significant ways. The first of these was that the software could no longer be transferred to another computer. In previous versions of Office, this restriction applied only to OEM editions; retail Office license agreements allowed uninstalling from one computer to install on another computer.

Digitally downloaded copies of Office were also said to be permanently locked to that PC's hardware, preventing it from being transferred to any other computing device. Should the buyer have wished to use Office 2013 on a different computer, or if they later became unable to use the computing device that the original license was downloaded to (e.g. hardware became inoperable due to malfunction) then a completely new, full-priced copy of Office 2013 would have to have been purchased to replace the prior one. Microsoft stated that this change was related to the software piracy that has been rampant for years, worldwide. However, many commentators saw this change as an effort to forcibly move its customers towards the subscription-based business model used by the Office 365 service. The legality of this move, particularly in Europe, has been questioned.

However, on March 6, 2013, Microsoft announced that equivalent transfer rights to those in the Office 2010 retail license agreements are applicable to retail Office 2013 copies effective immediately. Transfer of license from one computer to another owned by the same user is now allowed every 90 days, except in the case of hardware failure, in which the license may be moved sooner. The first user of the product is now also allowed to transfer it to another user. The second difference, which remains in the updated licensing agreement, is that the software can be installed on only one computer. In previous versions of Office, this restriction also applied only to OEM editions; retail Office license agreements allowed installing the product on two or three computers, depending on the edition.

Microsoft requires an account in order to activate any Office edition from 2013 on.

== Editions ==
Lineup of Microsoft Office 2013 icons, from left to right: Word, Excel, PowerPoint, Outlook, Access, OneNote, Publisher, Lync and InfoPath

=== Traditional editions ===
As with previous versions, Office 2013 is made available in several distinct editions aimed towards different markets. All traditional editions of Microsoft Office 2013 contain at least Word, Excel, PowerPoint and OneNote and are licensed for use on one computer.

Five traditional editions of Office 2013 were released:

- Home & Student: This retail suite includes the core applications Word, Excel, PowerPoint, and OneNote.
- Home & Business: This retail suite includes the core applications Word, Excel, PowerPoint, and OneNote plus Outlook.
- Standard: This suite, only available through volume licensing channels, includes the core applications Word, Excel, PowerPoint, and OneNote plus Outlook and Publisher.
- Professional: This retail suite includes the core applications Word, Excel, PowerPoint, and OneNote plus Outlook, Publisher and Access.
- Professional Plus: This suite includes the core applications Word, Excel, PowerPoint, and OneNote plus Outlook, Publisher, Access, InfoPath and Lync.

	Word	Excel	PowerPoint	OneNote	Outlook	Publisher	Access	InfoPath	Lync
Home & Student	+	+	+	+					
Home & Business	+	+	+	+	+				
Standard	+	+	+	+	+	+			
Professional	+	+	+	+	+	+	+		
Professional Plus	+	+	+	+	+	+	+	+	+

=== Office 365 ===
The Office 365 subscription services, which were previously aimed towards business and enterprise users, were expanded for Office 2013 to include new plans aimed at home use. The subscriptions allow use of the Office 2013 applications by multiple users using a software as a service model. Different plans are available for Office 365, some of which also include value-added services, such as 20 GB of OneDrive storage (later increased to 1 TB) and 60 Skype minutes per month on the new Home Premium plan. These new subscription offerings were positioned as a new option for consumers wanting a cost-effective way to purchase and use Office on multiple computers in their household.

=== Office RT ===
A special version of Office 2013, initially known as Office 2013 Home & Student RT, is shipped with all Windows RT devices. It initially consisted of Word, Excel, PowerPoint and OneNote. In Windows RT 8.1, the suite was renamed Office 2013 RT and Outlook was added. The edition, while visually indistinguishable from normal versions of Office 2013, contains special optimizations for ARM-based devices, such as changes to reduce battery usage (including, for example, freezing the animation of the blinking cursor for text editing during periods of inactivity), enabling touch mode by default to improve usability on tablets, and using the graphics portion of a device's SoC for hardware acceleration.

Windows RT devices on launch were shipped with a "preview" version of Office Home & Student 2013 RT. The release date for the final version varied depending on the user's language, and was distributed through Windows Update when released. On June 5, 2013, Microsoft announced that Windows RT 8.1 would add Outlook to the suite in response to public demand.

Office RT modifies or excludes other various features for compatibility reasons or resource reduction. To save disk space; templates, clip art, and language packs are downloaded online rather than stored locally. Other excluded features include the removal of support for third-party code such as macros/VBA/ActiveX controls, the removal of support for older media formats and narration in PowerPoint, editing of equations generated with the legacy Equation Editor, data models in Excel (PivotCharts, PivotTables, and QueryTables are unaffected), searching embedded media files in OneNote, along with data loss prevention, Group Policy support, and creating e-mails with information rights management in Outlook.

As the version of Office RT included on Windows RT devices is based on the Home & Student version, it cannot be used for "commercial, nonprofit, or revenue-generating activities" unless the organization has a volume license for Office 2013 already, or the user has an Office 365 subscription with commercial use rights.

=== Windows Store apps ===
Alongside Office RT, free versions of OneNote and the Lync client were made available as Windows Store apps. The OneNote app, originally known as OneNote MX, contains a limited feature set in comparison to its desktop version, but is also optimized for use on tablets. The OneNote app has since received several major updates, including camera integration, printing abilities, and multiple inking options.

Universal Microsoft Word, Excel, and PowerPoint apps were released in 2015.

=== Office Mobile ===
Windows Phone 8 ships with an updated version of the Office Mobile suite, consisting of mobile versions of Word, Excel, PowerPoint, and OneNote. In comparison to their Windows Phone 7 versions, the new versions add an improved Office Hub interface that can sync recently opened and modified documents (including changes to documents stored via Office 365 and SkyDrive), a separated OneNote app with additional features (such as voice notes and integration with the new "Rooms" functionality of the OS), and improved document editing and viewing functionality.

In June 2013, Microsoft released a version of Office Mobile for iPhone; it is similar to the Windows Phone version, but originally requires an Office 365 subscription to use. A version for Android smartphones was released in July 2013; it, too, originally needed Office 365 for use.

Apps for iPad and Android tablet computers were released in March 2014 and January 2015, respectively. These, along with their smartphone equivalents, have been made free for personal use, though certain premium features have been paywalled and require Office 365, which includes licensing of the apps for business use.

Windows 10 Mobile that was released in December 2015 included new Office apps, more in line with their iPhone and Android equivalent, and making use of the "universal app" platform pioneered.

=== Comparison ===
Comparison of Office 2013 suites
	As an individual product	Traditional editions						Office 365 subscriptions					
	As an individual product	Office RT	Home & Student	Home & Business	Standard	Professional	Professional Plus	Personal	Home	University	Small Business Premium	ProPlus	Enterprise
Availability	Varies	Windows RT	Retail, OEM	Retail, OEM	Volume licensing	Retail, OEM	Retail^{5}, Volume licensing	Software plus services	Software plus services	Software plus services	Software plus services	Software plus services	Software plus services
Maximum users	1	1	1	1	As licensed	1	As licensed	1	all users in one household	1	10	25	Unlimited
Devices per user	1	1	1	1	As licensed	1	As licensed	1 computer and 1 mobile	5 shared among all users	2 computers and 2 mobiles	5	5	5
Commercial use allowed?	Yes	Separate^{2}	No	Yes	Yes	Yes	Yes	No	No	No	Yes	Yes	Yes
Word	Yes	Yes^{1}	Yes	Yes	Yes	Yes	Yes	Yes	Yes	Yes	Yes	Yes	Yes
Excel	Yes	Yes^{1}	Yes	Yes	Yes	Yes	Yes	Yes	Yes	Yes	Yes	Yes	Yes
PowerPoint	Yes	Yes^{1}	Yes	Yes	Yes	Yes	Yes	Yes	Yes	Yes	Yes	Yes	Yes
OneNote	Yes^{3}	Yes^{1}	Yes	Yes	Yes	Yes	Yes	Yes	Yes	Yes	Yes	Yes	Yes
Outlook	Yes	Yes^{1}	No	Yes	Yes	Yes	Yes	Yes	Yes	Yes	Yes	Yes	Yes
Publisher	Yes	No	No	No	Yes	Yes	Yes	Yes	Yes	Yes	Yes	Yes	Yes
Access	Yes	No	No	No	No	Yes	Yes	Yes	Yes	Yes	Yes	Yes	Yes
InfoPath	No	No	No	No	No	No	Yes	No	No	No	No^{4}	Yes	Yes
Lync	Yes^{3}	No	No	No	No	No	Yes	No	No	No	Yes	Yes	Yes
SharePoint Designer	Yes	No	No	No	No	No	No	No	No	No	No	No	No
Project; Has multiple editions	Yes	No	No	No	No	No	No	No	No	No	No	No	No
Visio; Has multiple editions	Yes	No	Viewer	Viewer	Viewer	Viewer	Viewer	Viewer	Viewer	Viewer	Viewer	Viewer	Viewer

Remarks

^{1} The Windows RT versions do not include all of the functionality provided by other versions of Office.
^{2} Commercial use of Office RT is allowed through volume licensing or business subscriptions to Office 365.
^{3} Windows Store versions are also available.
^{4} InfoPath was initially part of Office 365 Small Business Premium. However, it's currently unavailable though subscription.
^{5} Professional Plus edition on the retail channel is/was available with MSDN subscription or via Microsoft Home Use Program.

== System requirements ==
Each Microsoft Office 2013 application has the following requirements, although there may be app-specific requirements.

Item	Requirement
CPU	1 GHz clock speed, IA-32 or x64 architecture with SSE2 support
RAM	IA-32 edition: 1 GB x64 edition: 2 GB
Hard disk drive	3.0 GB free disk space
Operating system	Windows 7, Windows Server 2008 R2 or later
Software	.NET Framework 3.5 or later

In addition to these, graphics hardware acceleration requires a screen resolution of 1024×576 pixels or larger and a DirectX 10-compliant GPU with at least 64 MB of video memory (in case of absence of the required hardware, however, Office 2013 applications can still run without graphics acceleration.)

== See also ==
- List of office suites
