= Microsoft Planner =

Task management software

- Developer: Microsoft
- Release: 6 June 2016; 10 years ago

Stable release(s) [±]
- Android: 1.18.39 / June 10, 2026; 5 months ago
- iOS (Note: Including iPadOS): 1.17.17 / June 10, 2026; 5 months ago
- Operating system: Android 7+; iOS 17+; Web
- Type: Productivity software
- Website: www.microsoft.com/en-us/microsoft-365/planner/microsoft-planner

Microsoft Planner is a planning application available on the Microsoft 365 platform. The application is only available to premium, business, and educational subscribers to Microsoft 365. Microsoft Planner is a team-work oriented tool that can be used in a variety of ways. Some of Planner's uses include team management, file sharing, and organization. On June 6, 2016 Microsoft made the application available for general release and rolled it out over the first few weeks to eligible subscription plans. Microsoft Planner is available through the App store and the Google Play store, as well as on a computer. On August 1st, 2025, Microsoft Project was integrated into Microsoft Planner.

Planner enables users and teams to create plans, assemble and assign tasks, share files, communicate and collaborate with other users, and receive progress updates. Microsoft Planner is linked with Microsoft 365 Groups, which allows users to collaborate through the platform. Each new plan created in Planner automatically creates a new Microsoft 365 group.

Microsoft Planner 2019-2024 logo (Still in use in the Android Version)
