= Microsoft Online Services =

Microsoft Online Services was Microsoft's hosted-software offering and was an early component of its software as a service strategy. Microsoft Online Services was hosted by Microsoft and sold with Microsoft partners.

Initial services branded as 'Microsoft Online Services' included Exchange Online, SharePoint Online, Office Communications Online, Microsoft Forefront, and Microsoft Office Live Meeting.

For businesses, the software as a service approach enables organizations to access the capabilities of enterprise software through on-premises servers, as online services, or a combination of both, depending on specific business requirements. Services also provide the option to add complementary capabilities that enhance on-premises server software and simplify system management and maintenance.

Around 2011, the products offered as 'Microsoft Online Services' were replaced by products within Office 365.

== Product Suite: Business Productivity Online Suite (BPOS) ==
The Business Productivity Online Suite Standard represented the first of a growing portfolio of Microsoft Online Services. The BPOS was a component of the broader Microsoft software as a service strategy that included both live and Online services. BPOS was succeeded by Office 365. Where BPOS was based on Microsoft Exchange 2007 and Microsoft Office SharePoint Server 2007, Office 365 was originally built around the 2010 versions of Exchange and Microsoft Office SharePoint Server (MOSS).

== Support ==
Microsoft established a specialized support department for its Business Productivity Online Suite (BPOS), distinct from its standard Professional Support Services. The various types of support requests that customers might make are the justification for this separation. In contrast to the support requests for Microsoft products run on a company's infrastructure, such as when a support inquiry is made about mail-sending issues using Outlook and the customer's Microsoft Exchange Server, the technical aspects of support requests for BPOS may differ significantly. Additionally, customer expectations are different, as outsourcing services to Microsoft is done to avoid problems. Thus, when issues arise, customers anticipate a rapid resolution by Microsoft. To meet these expectations, Microsoft has established dedicated BPOS and Office 365 support desks in the United States and Ireland for the EMEA region. Hewlett-Packard (HP), Microsoft's primary support partner, engaged in identifying and training new Tier 1 and Tier 2 support engineers for this purpose.
