= Microsoft Office Live =

Discontinued web-based service

- The homepage of Office Live Workspace
- Developer: Microsoft
- Stable release: Office Live Small Business
- Preview release: Office Live Workspace
- Operating system: Microsoft Windows, Mac OS X
- Type: Web application, Web development
- License: Proprietary
- Website: Archived official website at the Wayback Machine (archive index)

Microsoft Office Live is a discontinued web-based service providing document sharing and website creation tools for consumers and small businesses. Its successor was branded Windows Live. Office Live consisted of two services, Office Live Workspace, which was superseded by OneDrive, and Office Live Small Business, which was superseded by Office 365.

== Office Live Workspace ==
Office Live Workspace was a free service for storing and sharing documents online. Files could not be edited from within a workspace; clicking on "edit" would open them up in Microsoft Office.

== See also ==
- Comparison of office suites
