= Microsoft OneNote =

Freeform note-taking software

- Microsoft OneNote app icon

- Notes being created and organized in the Microsoft 365 version of OneNote on desktop, running on Windows 11
- Developer: Microsoft
- Release: November 19, 2003; 22 years ago

Stable release(s)
- Office 2024 (LTSC): 2408 (Build 17932.21056) / 13 October 2026; 25 days ago
- Office 2021 (LTSC): 2108 (Build 14334.20974) / 13 October 2026; 25 days ago
- Office 2019 (LTSC): 1808 (Build 10417.20207) / 13 October 2026; 25 days ago
- Office 2024 (Retail): 2610 (Build 20527.20150) / 3 November 2026; 4 days ago
- Office 2021 (Retail): 2609 (Build 20430.20182) / 13 October 2026; 25 days ago
- Office 2019 (Retail): 2509 (Build 19231.20194) / 14 October 2025; 12 months ago
OneNote app
- Android: 16.0 (Build 20026.20090) / May 26, 2026; 5 months ago
- iOS (Note: Including iPadOS, visionOS and watchOS): 16.112.4 / August 10, 2026; 2 months ago
- Windows (discontinued): 16001.14326.22594 / July 28, 2025; 15 months ago
- Operating system: Microsoft Windows, macOS, Android, ChromeOS, iOS, iPadOS, Windows Phone
- Type: Notetaking software
- License: Proprietary software, Freeware (OneNote 2013 and later)
- Website: products.office.com/onenote

Microsoft OneNote (UWP)

- Notes being created and organized in the OneNote UWP app, running on Windows 10
- Developer: Microsoft
- Release: July 16, 2012; 14 years ago
- Stable release: 16001.14326.22594.0 / July 31, 2025; 15 months ago
- Operating system: Windows 10
- Type: Notetaking software
- License: Freeware
- Website: products.office.com/onenote

OneNote.com
- Notes being created and organized on OneNote.com
- Website type: Notetaking software
- Owner: Microsoft
- Website: onenote.com
- Commercial: No
- Registration: Required

Microsoft OneNote is a note-taking software developed by Microsoft. It is available for free on all platforms since 2014 and is also bundled with the subscription Microsoft 365 and one-time purchase Microsoft Office suites. OneNote is designed for free-form information gathering and multi-user collaboration. It gathers users' notes, drawings, screen clippings, and audio commentaries. Notes can be shared with other OneNote users over the Internet or a network. OneNote also includes the Sticky Notes feature that may be used on its own.

OneNote is also available as a free, stand-alone app via the official website and the app stores of: Windows 10/11, MacOS, iOS, iPadOS and Android. Microsoft also provides a web-based version of OneNote as part of OneDrive and Office for the web.

== Overview ==
OneNote was announced by Microsoft's Bill Gates on November 17, 2002. The software allows users to create notes that can include text, pictures, tables, and drawings. Unlike a word processor, OneNote features an almost unbounded document window, in which users can click anywhere on the canvas to create a new text box at that location. OneNote saves data automatically as the user edits the file.

OneNote saves information in pages organized into sections within notebooks. Microsoft designed this user interface to resemble a tabbed ring binder, in which the user can directly make notes and gather material from other applications. OneNote notebooks collect, organize, and share possibly unpublished materials—as compared to word processors and wikis, which often target publishing in some way. The difference shows in certain OneNote features and characteristics:

- Pages can be arbitrarily large
- There is no enforced uniform page layout or structure.

Users can move pages in the binder and annotate them with a stylus or word-processing or drawing tools. Users may add embedded multimedia recordings and hyperlinks. They can also add embeddable content, such as YouTube videos. OneNote also integrates search features and indexing into a free-form graphics and audio repository. It can search pictures (e.g., screen captures, embedded document scans, photographs) for depictions of text. It also searches "electronic ink" annotations as text and phonetically searches audio recordings on a text key. It can replay audio concurrently with notes taken during the recording. It can also extract and copy texts from pictures and documents using optical character-recognition.

Its multi-user capability allows offline editing with later synchronization and merging. More than one person can work on the same page at the same time using OneNote as a shared whiteboard environment.

On March 17, 2014, Microsoft released the OneNote cloud service API, which allows third-party application developers to integrate the service into their apps. The API runs on Microsoft's globally available cloud and sends data from applications into the user's OneDrive. OneNote can render webpages as snapshot images.

Microsoft also announced several new features in OneNote that use the service API:

- OneNote Clipper: A browser bookmarklet, which uses the OneNote service API and enables users to save a screenshot of a webpage to OneNote along with the URL. The text in the screenshot is searchable.
- Email to OneNote: A feature enabling users to send emails to the address me@onenote.com from specified email IDs to have the contents of the email saved to OneNote. This feature has been discontinued in March 2025.

== File format ==
.one file icons for sections (left) and notebooks (right)

A OneNote notebook is stored as a folder with a separate data file for each section. OneNote files have a .one filename extension. A .one file can be a OneNote notebook or a OneNote section.

Microsoft upgraded the file format twice after it had introduced OneNote 2003 — first in OneNote 2007, then in OneNote 2010. OneNote 2003 files can be opened by both OneNote 2007 and OneNote 2010 in read-only mode and subsequently upgraded to the later versions of the file format. OneNote 2010 can read and write OneNote 2007 file formats. It can also convert back and forth between the 2010 and the 2007 formats.

Microsoft has documented the OneNote file format. It is an open format that can store varied multimedia content in a single .one file.

Multiple .one files can be exported to a .onepkg file, which stores multiple .one files (corresponding to the individual notebooks) in cabinet file format.

== Platform support ==
OneNote supports simultaneous editing of shared OneNote documents by multiple users when the document is stored in a shared folder in OneDrive. Dropbox was supported for some time as a sync protocol, but after Windows Live Mesh was discontinued, OneNote supported it for cloud-based storage and synchronization of OneNote files. OneNote clients, including the OneNote web app of Office Online, can view and edit them.

Microsoft made OneNote 2013 for Windows desktop available for free. OneNote for Windows and Mac are both based on a freemium model. Premium features such as SharePoint support, version history and Microsoft Outlook integration were previously available only to Office 365 and Office 2013 customers, but on February 13, 2015, Microsoft removed all feature restrictions, except creation of local notebooks — the free edition only stores notebooks on OneDrive — from the programs, essentially making the program completely free to use.

=== Windows ===
The first version, OneNote 2003, was only sold as a separate product for Windows compatible with Windows XP and Windows 2000 as well as for Microsoft Tablet PCs with pen input. Starting with Office 2007 it was then included as part of the Office suite, as the software was positioned more as a student tool rather than business.

A Microsoft Store version of OneNote (formerly known as OneNote MX) was available for Windows 8 and RT, using OneDrive as a storage place. It is optimized for use on tablets by implementing a pie menu interface and invoking operating system's tablet-specific functionality.

==== OneNote for Windows 10 ====
In 2018, Microsoft announced that for OneNote on Windows, the Universal Windows Platform (UWP) based OneNote for Windows 10, now renamed "OneNote for Windows 10", would be the default experience for Office users on Windows. The Win32/Win64 "desktop" version would remain known as OneNote 2016 despite the release of Office 2019, would no longer receive new features, and would not be installed with Office by default, but remain available as an option.

However, Microsoft reversed this decision in 2019; in the same year, the company announced that both versions would receive active development and the desktop version would once again be installed with Office by default. The desktop application was renamed to simply OneNote, matching the other programs in Office 365. OneNote is no longer installed with Windows starting from Windows 11, but is still available from Microsoft Store.

In 2021, Microsoft announced that OneNote for Windows 10 would be discontinued and that they were working on migrating users and features to the desktop version. They also announced that it would be receiving some user interface changes to be more in line with Windows 11.

Starting in April 2025, the OneNote for Windows 10 app began displaying a deprecation notice, encouraging users to transition to the desktop OneNote app. The UWP app officially reached its end of support in October 14, 2025, together with Windows 10.

=== Mobile ===
OneNote is also available for cell phones. Microsoft currently has a stand-alone OneNote app for iOS and Android.

OneNote Mobile for older Windows Mobile smartphones and pocket PCs was included with OneNote 2007. It was released with Windows Phone 7 in 2010. In 2011, OneNote Mobile went multi-platform as it was released for iPhone followed by a version for Symbian as part of Microsoft Apps. In 2012 Microsoft released OneNote for Android in a surprise move.

On July 1, 2013, Microsoft released version 2 of its app for iPad, containing significantly updated features, to correspond more closely to those available on the Windows platform. On August 19, 2014, Microsoft updated OneNote for Android tablets to include handwriting support and touch-friendly navigation. This version supports notebooks stored on OneDrive or SharePoint. In 2022, the Android version got a major refresh.

=== Mac ===
On March 17, 2014, Microsoft released OneNote for Mac. It is compatible with OS X Mavericks and above and can be downloaded for free from the Mac App Store.

The release of OneNote for Mac was part of Microsoft's broader strategy to make its Office suite more accessible across different platforms. This move was seen as a response to the increasing number of users who were working on multiple devices, including those running macOS. By offering OneNote for free, Microsoft aimed to attract new users and integrate their note-taking service into the broader ecosystem of Microsoft Office applications.

== Version and licensing differences ==
The desktop OneNote and OneNote for Windows 10 have different functionality and user interfaces, which also differ from the versions for other platforms. Compared to OneNote for Windows 10, the desktop OneNote has a full Office ribbon interface, features the most customization options, runs on multiple versions of Windows, and provides the possibility of local notebook support as opposed to OneDrive cloud storage; it is the only version for any platform to offer the latter feature, even as a paid option.

In addition to the version differences, OneNote features on Windows and Mac vary according to whether it is installed as a free or paid program. If a "compatible" Office license (whether for the subscription Office 365 or the perpetual Office 2019) is present on the machine, the Windows desktop, Windows 10, and Mac versions all unlock additional functionality, which varies depending on the version: the desktop OneNote adds local notebook support, the Mac version adds stickers and OneNote for Windows 10 gains several features including stickers, ink replay, Researcher and Math Assistant. More premium features are in development for the Mac and Windows 10 versions.

The Windows 10 version is being phased out in favor of the desktop app; features available in the Windows 10 version have been added to the Desktop app.

== Reception ==
Christopher Dawson reviewed OneNote 2010, titling his favorable review "OneNote is Office 2010's killer app in education". He speculated that the app would be particularly useful as a tool for student notetaking. In 2022 Microsoft has merged the OneNote and OneNote for Windows 10 apps into a single version, the older version OneNote for Windows 10 will continue to work but it will not get new updates, noting that "it will reach end-of-support in October 2025". In 2023, Tom Warren of The Verge highlighted a new digital ink and pen feature addition gestures, and an AI-powered copilot feature to help you summarize pages or section of notes. In Q4 2024, OneNote had 2.87million downloads. As of December 2025, OneNote had more than 500M+ downloads on Google PlayStore. It has a 3.8 star rating on Microsoft Store with 323 ratings.

== Release history ==
Microsoft OneNote 2010 with an open side note

All release dates pertain to general availability. Release to manufacturing is usually two or three months in advance. This table only includes editions released for Windows.

Product release	Release date	Editions of Microsoft Office included in
Microsoft Office OneNote 2003	November 19, 2003	None
Microsoft Office OneNote 2007	January 27, 2007	Microsoft Office 2007 Home and Student, Enterprise, Ultimate
Microsoft OneNote 2010	July 15, 2010	Microsoft Office 2010 Home and Student, Home and Business, Standard, Professional, Professional Plus
Microsoft OneNote 2013	January 29, 2013	Microsoft Office 2013 (all editions)
Microsoft OneNote for Windows 10	July 29, 2015	Microsoft Office 2019 (until 2020)
Microsoft OneNote 2016 (now known as Microsoft OneNote)	September 22, 2015	Microsoft Office 2016 (all editions) Microsoft Office 2019 (from March 2020) Microsoft Office 2021; Microsoft 365

== See also ==
- Comparison of notetaking software
