= Sunrise Calendar =

Discontinued calendar application

- Sunrise Calendar on Android
- Original authors: Sunrise Atelier, Inc. (Pierre Valade: co-founder and CEO; Jeremy Le Van: co-founder)
- Developer: Microsoft Corporation
- Initial release: February 19, 2013
- Operating system: OS X, Windows, iOS, Android, web browser
- Type: Electronic calendaring
- License: Freeware
- Website: Sunrise Calendar's blog - at the Wayback Machine (archived 2015-02-27)

Sunrise is a discontinued electronic calendar application for mobile and desktop. The service was launched in 2013 by designers Pierre Valade and Jeremy Le Van. In October 2015, Microsoft announced that they had merged the Sunrise Calendar team into the larger Microsoft Outlook team where they will work closely with the Microsoft Outlook Mobile service.

== History ==
The first iteration of Sunrise launched in 2012 and was a daily email digest of appointments, events and birthdays.

Sunrise was launched initially as an iPhone application on February 19, 2013.

In June 2013, Sunrise raised $2.2 million (~$2.91 million in 2024) in venture funding from Resolute.vc, NextView Ventures, Lerer Hippeau Ventures, SV Angel, and other angel investment firms like Loïc Le Meur, Dave Morin, Fabrice Grinda.

In May 2014, Sunrise launched on Android as well as on the web via a web application.

In July 2014, Sunrise announced it had raised $6 million (~$7.81 million in 2024) Series A from Balderton Capital. Bernard Liautaud joined the board.

On February 11, 2015, Sunrise Atelier, Inc. was acquired by Microsoft for US$100 million (~$129 million in 2024).

On October 28, 2015, Microsoft announced that Sunrise would be discontinued, and its functionality merged into Outlook Mobile. Microsoft later stated that the app would permanently cease functioning on August 31, 2016, but the shutdown was delayed to September 13, 2016, to coincide with an update to Outlook Mobile that incorporates aspects of Sunrise into its calendar interface.

== Features ==
Sunrise allowed users to connect with Google Calendar, iCloud calendar and with Exchange Server. The following third-party services featured integration with Sunrise: Foursquare, GitHub, TripIt, Asana, Evernote, Google Tasks, Trello, Songkick, and Wunderlist. As a web app, users could sign-in and use Sunrise in a web browser, with no downloads required. A native Sunrise app could also be downloaded for OS X 10.9 and later, iOS 8.0 and later (both iPhone and iPad) as well as Android phones and tablets.

In May 2015, Sunrise launched Meet, a keyboard for Android and iOS that lets users select available time slots in their calendar to schedule one-to-ones.
