= Microsoft account =

User account for Microsoft-owned services

- Developer: Microsoft
- Type: Single sign-on provider
- Platforms: iOS, Android, Web (JavaScript)
- Operating systems: Windows 8 and later, Xbox system software
- Status: Active
- Pricing model: Free
- Website: account.microsoft.com

A Microsoft account (MSA; previously known as Microsoft Passport, .NET Passport, and Windows Live ID) is a single sign-on personal user account for Microsoft customers to log in to consumer Microsoft services (like Outlook.com), devices running on one of Microsoft's current operating systems (e.g. Microsoft Windows computers and tablets, Xbox consoles), and Microsoft application software (e.g. Microsoft Office, Microsoft Teams).

== Overview ==
A Microsoft account allows users to sign into websites that support this service using a single set of credentials - these usernames are in the same form as an email address. There are two different methods for creating an account:

1. Use an existing e-mail address: Users are able to use their own valid e-mail address to sign up for a Microsoft account. The service turns the requesting user's e-mail address into a Microsoft account ID. Users may also choose a password of their own choice.
2. Sign up for a Microsoft e-mail address: Users can also sign up for a free e-mail account through Outlook.com or MSN, with Microsoft's webmail services designated domains (i.e. @hotmail.com, @outlook.com, @msn.com (Note: @msn.com addresses are only offered to MSN Dial-Up Internet Access and MSN Premium customers)) that can be used as a Microsoft account to sign into other Microsoft account-enabled websites.

The domains @live.com and @passport.com, as well as other domains are no longer offered, but existing accounts are maintained.

Microsoft websites, services, and apps such as Bing, MSN and Xbox Live use Microsoft account as a means of identifying users. There are also several other companies that use it, such as the Hoyts website which is hosted by NineMSN.

Windows XP and later has an option to link a local Windows user account with a Microsoft account, thus automatically logging users in to their Microsoft account whenever a service is accessed. Starting with Windows 8 and Windows Server 2012, Windows allows users to directly authenticate into their PCs using their Microsoft account rather than a local or domain user.

=== Login methods ===
In addition to using an account password, users can log into their Microsoft account by accepting a mobile notification sent to a mobile device with Microsoft Authenticator, a FIDO2 security token or by using Windows Hello. Users can also set up two-factor authentication by getting a time-based, single-use code by text, phone call or using an authenticator app.

=== Technical details ===
Users' credentials are not checked by Microsoft account-enabled websites, but by a Microsoft account authentication server. A new user signing into a Microsoft account-enabled website is first redirected to the nearest authentication server, which asks for username and password over an SSL connection. The user may select to have their computer remember their login: a newly signed-in user has an encrypted time-limited cookie stored on their computer and receives a triple DES encrypted ID-tag that previously has been agreed upon between the authentication server and the Microsoft account-enabled website. This ID-tag is then sent to the website, upon which the website plants another encrypted HTTP cookie in the user's computer, also time-limited. As long as these cookies are valid, the user is not required to supply a username and password. If the user actively logs out of their Microsoft account, these cookies will be removed.

=== Relationship with work or school account ===
Microsoft also offers a work or school account which are set up by an administrator as part of an organization. These accounts are separate from Microsoft accounts (which is also called personal account) and cannot be merged, but may be used side-by-side by a user. A work or school account uses the Azure Active Directory domain platform.

== History ==
Microsoft account icon used until 2025

Microsoft Passport, the predecessor to Windows Live ID, was originally positioned as a single sign-on service for all web commerce. Microsoft Passport received much criticism. A prominent critic was Kim Cameron, the author of The Laws of Identity, who questioned Microsoft Passport in its violations of those laws. He then joined Microsoft in 1999 after his company was acquired and was its chief architect of access and identity until his 2019 retirement, helping to address those violations in the design of the Microsoft Account identity meta-system. As a consequence, Microsoft Accounts are not positioned as the single sign-on service for all web commerce, but as one choice of many among identity systems.

In December 1999, Microsoft neglected to pay their annual $35 "passport.com" domain registration fee to Network Solutions. The oversight made Hotmail, which used the site for authentication, unavailable on December 24. A Linux consultant, Michael Chaney, paid it the next day (Christmas), hoping it would solve this issue with the downed site. The payment resulted in the site being available the next morning. In Autumn 2003, a similar good Samaritan helped Microsoft when they missed payment on the "hotmail.co.uk" address, although no downtime resulted.

In 2001, the Electronic Frontier Foundation's staff attorney Deborah Pierce criticized Microsoft Passport as a potential threat to privacy after it was revealed that Microsoft would have full access to and usage of customer information. The privacy terms were quickly updated by Microsoft to allay customers' fears.

In July and August 2001, the Electronic Privacy Information Center and a coalition of fourteen leading consumer groups filed complaints with the Federal Trade Commission (FTC) alleging that the Microsoft Passport system violated Section 5 of the Federal Trade Commission Act (FTCA), which prohibits unfair or deceptive practices in trade. In August 2002, Microsoft agreed to settle the resulting FTC charges. As part of the settlement, Microsoft was required to implement and maintain a comprehensive security program, as well as being prohibited from misrepresenting information practices.

Microsoft had pushed for non-Microsoft entities to create an Internet-wide unified-login system. Examples of sites that used Microsoft Passport were eBay and Monster.com, but in 2004 those agreements were canceled. In August 2009, Expedia sent notice out stating they no longer support Microsoft Passport / Windows Live ID.

In 2012, Windows Live ID was renamed to Microsoft account.

== Features ==
Users with a Microsoft Account can use the Microsoft Account website to manage their identity. Features of the website include:

- updating user's information such as first and last names, address, etc. associated with the account;
- updating user settings, such as preferred language or preferences for email communications;
- changing or resetting user passwords;
- view billing details associated with the accounts;
- close the account.

=== Integrated with ===
The following is a list of computer programs and web services that support using Microsoft Account as the credentials required for the authentication process.

- Windows 8 and later
- Windows Server 2012 and later
- Windows components
  - Calendar
  - Copilot
  - Feedback Hub
  - Mail
  - Movies & TV
  - Microsoft Store
  - People
  - Windows Messenger
- Windows Phone 7 and later
  - Windows Phone Store
- Bing
- Clipchamp
- Exchange Online
- Exchange Online Protection
- Microsoft Office
- Microsoft 365 (formerly Office 365)
- Office Online
- OneDrive (formerly SkyDrive)
- Outlook.com (formerly Hotmail)
- Skype
- System Center Advisor
- Visual Studio
- Microsoft Azure (formerly Windows Azure)
- Windows Insider Program
- Windows Live Messenger
- Windows Photo Gallery
- Xbox network (includes PC Game Pass profile)

=== Web authentication ===
On August 15, 2007, Microsoft released the Windows Live ID Web Authentication SDK, enabling web developers to integrate Windows Live ID into their websites running on a broad range of web server platforms - including ASP.NET (C#), Java, Perl, PHP, Python and Ruby.

=== Support for OpenID ===
On October 27, 2008, Microsoft announced that it was publicly committed to supporting the OpenID framework, with Windows Live ID becoming an OpenID provider. This would allow users to use their Windows Live ID to sign into any website that supports OpenID authentication. There had been no update on Microsoft's planned implementation of OpenID since August 2009. However, since November 2013 Microsoft has publicly participated in OpenID Connect interoperability testing.

== Security vulnerabilities ==
On June 17, 2007, Erik Duindam, a web developer in the Netherlands, reported a privacy and identity risk, saying a "critical error was made by Microsoft programmers that allows everyone to create an ID for virtually any e-mail address." A procedure was found to allow users to register invalid or currently used e-mail addresses. Upon registration with a valid e-mail address, an e-mail verification link was sent to the user. Before using it however, the user was allowed to change the e-mail address to one that did not exist, or to an e-mail address currently used by someone else. The verification link then caused the Windows Live ID system to confirm the account as having a verified email address. That flaw was fixed two days later, on June 19, 2007.

On April 20, 2012, Microsoft fixed a flaw in Hotmail's password reset system that allowed anyone to reset the password of any Hotmail account. The company was notified of the flaw by researchers at Vulnerability Lab on the same day and responded with a fix within hours — but not before widespread attacks as the exploitation technique spread quickly across the Internet.

On December 3, 2015, a security researcher discovered a vulnerability in the Adobe Experience Manager (AEM) software used on signout.live.com and reported it to the Microsoft Security Response Center (MSRC). This vulnerability enabled full-administrative access to the AEM Publish nodes' OSGi console and made it possible to execute code inside of the JVM through the upload of a custom OSGi bundle. The vulnerability was confirmed to have been resolved on May 3, 2016.

== See also ==
- Identity management
- Identity management system
- List of single sign-on implementations

Other identity services

- Active Directory Federation Services
- OpenID
- Light-weight Identity
- Yadis
- Windows CardSpace

Identity management

- Liberty Alliance
- OASIS (organization)
- Windows Hello
