= OneDrive =

File hosting and synchronization service operated by Microsoft

Microsoft OneDrive for Web
- OneDrive logo

- Website type: File-hosting service
- Available in: 105 languages
- List of languages: Afrikaans; Albanian; Amharic; Arabic; Assamese; Azerbaijani (Latin); Bangla (Bangladesh); Bangla (India); Basque (Basque); Belarusian; Bosnian (Latin); Bulgarian; Catalan; Central Kurdish; Cherokee (Cherokee); Croatian; Czech; Danish; Dari; Dutch; English (United Kingdom); English (United States); Estonian; Filipino; Finnish; French; Galician; Georgian; German; Greek; Gujarati; Hausa; Hebrew; Hindi; Hungarian; Icelandic; Igbo; Indonesian; Irish; isiXhosa; isiZulu; Italian; Japanese; K’iche’; Kannada; Kazakh; Khmer; Kinyarwanda; Kiswahili; Konkani; Korean; Kyrgyz; Latvian; Lithuanian; Luxembourgish; Macedonian; Malay; Malayalam; Maltese; Maori; Marathi; Mongolian (Cyrillic); Nepali; Norwegian (Bokmål); Norwegian (Nynorsk); Odia; Persian; Polish; Portuguese (Brazil); Portuguese (Portugal); Punjabi (Gurmukhi); Punjabi (Pakistan); Quechua; Romanian; Russian; Scottish Gaelic; Serbian (Bosnia and Herzegovina); Serbian (Serbia, Montenegro); Sesotho sa Leboa; Setswana; Simplified Chinese; Sindhi; Sinhala; Slovak; Slovenian; Spanish; Swedish; Tajik; Tamil; Tatar; Telugu; Thai; Tigrinya; Traditional Chinese; Turkish; Turkmen; Ukrainian; Urdu; Uyghur; Uzbek (Latin); Valencian; Vietnamese; Welsh; Wolof; Yoruba
- Owner: Microsoft
- Website: onedrive.live.com
- IPv6 support: No
- Launched: August 1, 2007; 19 years ago as SkyDrive; February 19, 2014; 12 years ago as OneDrive

Microsoft OneDrive is a file-hosting service operated by Microsoft. First released as SkyDrive in August 2007, it allows registered users to store, share, back-up and synchronize their files. OneDrive also works as the storage backend of the web version of Microsoft 365. OneDrive offers 5 gigabytes of storage space free of charge, with 100 GB, 1 TB, and 6 TB storage options available, either separately or with Microsoft 365 subscriptions.

The OneDrive client app adds file synchronization and cloud backup features to its device. The app comes included with Microsoft Windows, and is also currently available for macOS, Android and iOS. In addition, Microsoft 365 apps directly integrate with OneDrive.

== History ==
Logo of Windows Live Folders

Logo of Skydrive from 2009 to 2012

Logo of SkyDrive from 2012 to 2014

At its launch, OneDrive, then known as Windows Live Folders (codenamed SkyDrive), was provided as a limited beta available to a few testers in the United States. On August 1, 2007, the service was expanded to a wider audience. Shortly thereafter, on August 9, 2007, the service was renamed Windows Live SkyDrive and made available to testers in the United Kingdom and India. As of 22 May 2008 SkyDrive was initially available in 38 countries and regions, later expanded to 62. On December 2, 2008, the capacity of an individual SkyDrive account was upgraded from 5 GB to 25 GB, and Microsoft added a separate entry point called Windows Live Photos which allowed users to access their photos and videos stored on SkyDrive. This entry point allowed users to add "People tags" to their photos, download photos into Windows Photo Gallery or as a ZIP file, as well as viewing Exif metadata such as camera information for the photos uploaded. Microsoft also added the ability to have full-screen slide shows for photos using Silverlight.

SkyDrive was updated to "Wave 4" release on June 7, 2010, and added the ability to work with Office Web Apps (now known as Office Online), with versioning. In this update, due to the discontinuation of Windows Live Toolbar, the ability to synchronise and share bookmarked web links between users via SkyDrive was also discontinued. However, users were still able to use Windows Live Mesh, which replaced the previous Windows Live Favorites, to synchronize their favorites between computers until its discontinuation in February 2013.

In June 2010, users of Office Live Workspace, released in October 2007, were migrated to Windows Live Office. The migration included all existing workspaces, documents, and sharing permissions. The merger of the two services was a result of Microsoft's decision to merge its Office Live team into Windows Live in January 2009, as well as several deficiencies with Office Live Workspace, which lacked high-fidelity document viewing and did not allow files to be edited from within the web browser. Office Live Workspace also did not offer offline collaboration and co-authoring functionality – instead documents were "checked out" and "checked in", though the service did integrate with SharedView for real-time screen sharing.

On June 20, 2011, Microsoft overhauled the user interface for SkyDrive, built using HTML5 technologies. The updated version featured caching, hardware acceleration, HTML video, quick views, cleaner arrangement of photos and infinite scrolling. Microsoft also doubled the file size limit from 50 MB to 100 MB per file. With this update, Microsoft consolidated the different entry points for SkyDrive, such as Windows Live Photos and Windows Live Office, into one single interface. Files and folders shared with a user, including those in Windows Live Groups, were also accessible in the new interface. On November 29, 2011, Microsoft updated SkyDrive to make sharing and file management easier, as well as HTML5 and other updates. This update also allowed users to see how much storage they had (and how much they had used), a feature that had been removed in the previous update as part of the redesign.

On December 3, 2011, Microsoft released SkyDrive apps for iOS and Windows Phone, which are available in the App Store and Windows Phone Store respectively. On April 22, 2012, Microsoft released a SkyDrive desktop app for Windows Vista, 7 and 8.0, as well as macOS, allowing users to synchronize files on SkyDrive, much like Windows Live Mesh, and to "fetch" files on their computer via the web browser. In addition, SkyDrive also provided additional storage available for purchase and reduced the free storage space for new users to 7 GB (from 25 GB.) Existing users were offered a free upgrade offer to retain their 25 GB of free storage. The updated SkyDrive also allowed files up to 2 GB in size (uploaded via the SkyDrive desktop app). The update also brought additional features such as Open Document Format (ODF) capability, URL shortening services and direct sharing of files to Twitter.

On August 14, 2012, Microsoft announced a new update for SkyDrive which brought changes and improvements to SkyDrive.com, SkyDrive for Windows desktop and OS X, and the SkyDrive API as part of Live Connect. For SkyDrive.com, the updates brought a new "modern" design for the web service consistent with Outlook.com, and along with the UI update the service also received improvements such as instant search, contextual toolbar, multi-select in thumbnail view, drag-and-drop files into folders, and sorting improvements. For the SkyDrive for Windows desktop and macOS applications, the update brought new performance improvements to photo uploads and the sync experience. The update also improved the SkyDrive API with the removal of file type restrictions, ability to upload images in their full resolution, as well as a new SkyDrive file picker for opening and saving files. On August 28, 2012, Microsoft released a SkyDrive app for Android on Google Play store. On September 18, 2012, Microsoft also introduced a recycle bin feature on SkyDrive and announced that SkyDrive will allow users to create online surveys via Excel Web App.

=== Sky lawsuit and OneDrive renaming ===
Microsoft became involved in a lawsuit with British television broadcaster Sky UK for using the word "Sky", resulting in a High Court ruling in June 2013 that the service's brand breached Sky's trademark. On July 31, 2013, in a joint press release between Sky and Microsoft, it was announced that a settlement had been reached and as a result the 'SkyDrive' name would be changed to 'OneDrive'. Sky allowed Microsoft to continue using the brand "for a reasonable period of time to allow for an orderly transition to a new brand". The change was made on most platforms on February 19, 2014, following an announcement on January 27.

On June 18, 2015, Microsoft launched an improved design of OneDrive for the web.

In 2015 Microsoft removed the unlimited storage plan for Office 365 Home, Personal and University packages, reduced the free OneDrive storage from 15 GB to 5 GB, and replaced paid subscriptions to 100 GB and 200 GB plans to a $1.99 per month 50 GB plan. These changes caused major controversy with users, some of whom petitioned Microsoft to reverse the plans. By November 21, 2015, in response to Microsoft's November 2 announcement, over 70,000 people had taken to the official OneDrive uservoice to voice their concerns. According to Microsoft these changes were a response to people abusing the service by using OneDrive to store PC backups, movie collections, and DVR recordings.

== Storage ==
=== Quota ===
As of November 2024 the service offers 5 GB of free storage for new users. Additional storage is available for purchase.

The amount of storage available has changed several times. Initially, the service provided 7 GB of storage and, for one year, an additional 3 GB of free storage to students. Users who signed up to OneDrive prior to April 22, 2012 were able to opt-in for a limited time offer of 25 GB of free storage upgrade. The service is built using HTML5 technologies, and files up to 300 MB can be uploaded via drag and drop into the web browser, or up to 10 GB via the OneDrive desktop application for Microsoft Windows and OS X. From September 23, 2013 onwards, in addition to 7 GB of free storage (or 25 GB for users eligible for the free upgrade), power users who required more storage could choose from one of four paid storage plans.

Users in some regions may need to have a certain payment card or PayPal account to pay. The paid storage plan is renewed automatically each year unless Microsoft or the user cancels the service.

Upon the re-launch as OneDrive, monthly payment plans were introduced, along with the ability to earn up to 5 GB of free storage for referring new users to OneDrive (500 MB each), and 3 GB if users enable automatic uploads of photos using the OneDrive mobile apps on smartphones. Subscribers to Office 365's home-oriented plans also receive additional storage for use with the service, with 20 GB per user.

In June 2014 it was announced that OneDrive's default storage would increase to 15 GB, putting it in line with its competitor Google Drive. An additional 15 GB were offered for activating camera roll backup on a mobile device, putting it ahead of Google Drive until November 2015, when this bonus was cancelled. The amount of additional storage for Office 365 subscribers also increased to 1 TB. Microsoft reduced the price of OneDrive storage subscriptions at that time.

In October 2014 Microsoft announced that it would offer unlimited OneDrive storage to all Office 365 subscribers. However, on November 3, 2015, the 1 TB cap was reinstated. Microsoft additionally announced the planned replacement of its 100 GB and 200 GB plans with a new 50 GB plan in early 2016, and the reduction of free storage from 15 GB to 5 GB. Any current accounts over this limit could keep the increased storage for at least 12 months. Following calls for Microsoft to reverse the reduction decision, Microsoft announced on December 11 of the same year that it would allow existing users to request to have up to 30 GB of free storage unaffected by the reduction, and said it would fully refund customers of Office 365 not satisfied with the 1 TB cap, among other redress.

In June 2019, alongside the announcement for the Personal Vault, Microsoft announced that it would increase the OneDrive standalone storage plan from 50 GB to 100 GB at no additional charge, and that it would be giving Office 365 subscribers a new option to add more storage as they need it.

=== Versioning ===
OneDrive initially did not store previous versions of files, except for Microsoft Office formats. In July 2017, however, Microsoft OneDrive team announced that version history support for all file types was the top requested feature; as such, OneDrive would keep older versions of all files for up to 30 days.

=== Recycle bin ===
OneDrive implements a "recycle bin"; files the user chooses to delete are stored there for a time, without counting as part of the user's allocation, and can be reinstated until they are ultimately purged from OneDrive.

=== Download as ZIP files ===
Entire folders can be downloaded as a single ZIP file with OneDrive. For a single download, there is a limit of 15 GB; the total ZIP file size limit is 20 GB; and up to 10,000 files can be included in a ZIP file.

=== Files On-Demand ===
On Windows 10 and Windows 11, OneDrive can utilize Files On-Demand, where files synchronized with OneDrive show up in File Explorer, but do not require any disk space. As soon as the content of the file is required, the file is downloaded in the background.

== Editing ==
=== Office for the web ===
Microsoft added Office for the web (known at the time as Office Web Apps, later renamed to Office Online and again to just Office) capability to OneDrive in its "Wave 4" update, allowing users to upload, create, edit and share Word, Excel, PowerPoint and OneNote documents directly within a web browser. In addition, Office for the web allows multiple users to simultaneously co-author Excel documents in a web browser, and co-author OneNote documents with another web user or the desktop application. Users can also view the version history of Office documents stored on OneDrive.

=== Formats ===
OneDrive allows the viewing of documents in Portable Document Format (PDF), and in the Open Document Format (ODF), an XML-based file format supported by a number of word processing applications, including Microsoft Office, LibreOffice, Apache OpenOffice and Corel's WordPerfect. OneDrive's search function supports search within PDF documents.

OneDrive includes an online text editor that allows users to view and edit files in plain text format, such as text files and batch files. Syntax highlighting and code completion is available for a number of programming and markup languages, including C#, Visual Basic, JavaScript, Windows PowerShell, CSS, HTML, XML, PHP and Java. This online editor includes a find-and-replace feature and a way to manage file merging conflicts.

== Photos and videos ==
OneDrive can use geo-location data for photos uploaded to the service, and will automatically display a map of the tagged location. OneDrive also allows users to tag people in photos uploaded via the web interface or via Windows Photo Gallery. OneDrive also has support for the UWP app, Microsoft Photos.

Photos uploaded to OneDrive can be played as an automatic slideshow. Images uploaded to OneDrive will be recognized as 360° images if they are taken with popular models of 360° cameras in a panoramic mode, right from within the OneDrive.

== Client apps ==
OneDrive
- OneDrive client app, as appears on PC, Xbox One and HoloLens
- Developer: Microsoft

Stable release(s) [±]
- Windows: July 2026 Update (26.129.0706.0004) / August 5, 2026; 3 months ago
- macOS: July 2026 Update (26.134.0713.0004) / August 5, 2026; 3 months ago
- Android: 7.45.1 / December 16, 2025; 10 months ago
- iOS (Note: Including iPadOS and vision OS): 18.6.7 / August 5, 2026; 3 months ago
- Operating system: Windows 10, 11; macOS 14+; Android 8+; iOS 18+ (Note: Including iPadOS); visionOS 2+; Web
- Type: File manager, file synchronization
- Website: onedrive.live.com/about/download/

Microsoft has released OneDrive client applications for Android, iOS, Windows 7, Windows 8, Windows 10, Windows 11, Windows 10 Mobile, Windows Phone, Xbox 360, and Xbox One that allow users to browse, view and organize files stored on their OneDrive cloud storage. In addition, Microsoft also released desktop applications for Microsoft Windows (Vista and later) and macOS (10.7 Lion and later) that allow users to synchronize their entire OneDrive storage with their computers for offline access, as well as between multiple computers. The OneDrive client for Windows allows users to "fetch" the contents of their PCs via the web browser, provided the user enabled this option; macOS users can fetch from a PC, but not vice versa. The Android, iOS and Windows Phone 8 versions also allow camera photos to automatically be uploaded to OneDrive. Upon the re-branding as OneDrive, the Xbox One app also added achievements.

The OneDrive client app integrates itself in Windows 7 and later as well as Microsoft Office 2010 and later, enabling users to access documents, photos and videos stored on their OneDrive account; its installer is shipped with Windows 8.1 and later, where it is executed during each first user login and installed below %LOCALAPPDATA% into the user profile, unprotected against tampering, thus violating Microsoft's own guidelines for proper installation of applications. OneDrive is also integrated in the Office and Photos hub of Windows Phone. OneDrive in Windows 8.1 can sync user settings and files, through either the included OneDrive app (originally called SkyDrive, until the name was changed with a Windows update) or File Explorer, deprecating the previous Windows client. Along with the use of reparse points, these changes allow files to be accessed directly from OneDrive as if they are stored locally. The OneDrive app was also updated to include a local file manager. Unlike on Windows 8, use of OneDrive on Windows 8.1 requires the user's Windows account be linked to a Microsoft account; the previous OneDrive desktop client (which did not have this requirement) no longer works on Windows 8.1. Additionally, the Fetch feature does not work on Windows 8.1.

In an update on July 4, 2017, OneDrive desktop client started showing an error message to the effect that the local OneDrive folder must be located on an NTFS volume only. Other file systems, including the older FAT32 and exFAT, as well as the newer ReFS were not supported. Microsoft further commented that this was always the requirement; it had merely fixed a bug in which the warning was not displayed. Microsoft also denied this feature having anything to do with the forthcoming OneDrive Files On-Demand.

=== Integration with Microsoft Office ===
Microsoft Office, starting with Microsoft Office 2010 and Microsoft Office for Mac 2011, allows users to directly open or save documents to OneDrive, or simultaneously edit shared documents with other users. Changes are synchronized when a document is saved and, where conflicts occur, the saving user can choose which version to keep; users can also use several different desktop and web programs to edit the same shared document.

Microsoft OneNote users can sync one or more of their notebooks using OneDrive. Once a notebook is selected for sharing, OneDrive copies the notebook from the user's computer to OneDrive, and that online copy then becomes the original for all future changes. The originating copy remains on the user's hard drive but is no longer updated by OneNote. Users can switch back to an offline-only version of the notebook by manually changing its location in OneNote, but unpredictable results may occur, including the OneNote application crashing and loss of notebook data under certain conditions. Under such circumstances, re-sharing the Notebook to OneDrive may result in recovery of the lost data.

=== Personal Vault ===
In September 2019 Microsoft announced Personal Vault. It is a protected area in OneDrive where users can store their most important or sensitive files and photos without sacrificing the convenience of anywhere access. Personal Vault has a strong authentication method or a second step of identity verification, such as fingerprint, face, PIN, or a code sent via email or SMS. Personal Vault is not available in macOS app.

== Interoperability ==
OneDrive allows users to embed their Word, Excel and PowerPoint documents into other web pages. These embedded documents allow anyone who visits these web pages to interact with them, such as browsing an embedded PowerPoint slideshow or perform calculations within an embedded Excel spreadsheet. In addition, Microsoft has released a set of APIs for OneDrive via Live Connect to enable developers to develop web services and client apps utilizing OneDrive's cloud storage. This allows users of these web services and client apps to browse, view, upload or edit files stored on OneDrive. A software development kit (SDK) is available for .NET Framework, iOS, Android and Python with a limited set of API for web apps and Windows.

OneDrive is already interoperable with a host of web services, including:

- Outlook.com: Allows users to:
  - Directly upload Office documents and photos within Outlook.com, store them on OneDrive and share them with other users.
  - Directly save Office documents within Outlook.com to OneDrive, and view or edit these documents directly within the web browser.
  - Edit Office documents within the web browser using Office Online and reply directly back to the sender with the edits made.
- Facebook, Twitter and LinkedIn: Enables users to quickly share their files with their contacts on these social networks. OneDrive maintains an access control list of all users with permissions to view or edit the files, including those users on social networks.
- Bing: Save & Share feature allows users to save search histories into a OneDrive folder.
- Windows Live Groups: Before being discontinued, Windows Live Groups provided each group with 1 GB of storage space on OneDrive to be shared between the group members. Group members were allowed to access, create, modify and delete files within the group's OneDrive folders, along with the other functionality that OneDrive provides. However, these features eventually became native to OneDrive.
- Samsung Gallery: Users can sync their photos and videos from the gallery of Samsung Devices to OneDrive through the partnership of Microsoft and Samsung.

== Privacy concerns, criticisms ==
Data stored on OneDrive is subject to monitoring through technologies like PhotoDNA. Any content that is in violation of Microsoft's Code of Conduct is subject to removal, and may lead to temporary or permanent shutdown of the associated Microsoft account. Closing an account without pre-notice is in most cases illegal in many jurisdictions, like in Germany. This has led to privacy concerns in relation to data stored on OneDrive. Microsoft has responded by indicating that "strict internal policies [are] in place to limit access to a user's data", and that advanced mechanisms, such as Microsoft's automated PhotoDNA scanning tool, are utilized to ensure users abide with the Code of Conduct and that their account does not contain files in contravention thereof, such as partial human nudity (including art or drawings), or any online surveys.

Other critics argue that Microsoft retains the encryption keys, thus being able to decrypt users content at any time. The corporation provides user data to local law enforcement on request, or when they suspect content that violates law is being stored in a OneDrive account.

Microsoft accounts associated with flagged OneDrive content can be suspended without notice. Consequently, the account holder will lose access to the data stored in their Microsoft account, such as OneDrive files and Outlook emails, contacts, and calendar. There have also been concerns about people who have been automatically flagged losing all their Microsoft account data even after being cleared by local law enforcement. In some cases people have been locked out of their online accounts that were using Microsoft's two-factor authentication app, losing their Xbox games library, and being unable to use their Microsoft Office 365 licence. Some people using the BitLocker drive encryption software also risk losing their local disk data, if the recovery key for their data was stored in OneDrive, as per Microsoft's recommendations. It is reported that at least 100 users in Germany have been affected by this up to 2022.

== OneDrive for Business ==
Microsoft has a similarly named but unrelated software plus service offering called OneDrive for Business (previously SkyDrive Pro). While OneDrive is a personal storage service on the web, OneDrive for Business is a managed cloud storage for business users that replaces SharePoint Workspace. The physical medium on which the information is stored can be either hosted on-premises or purchased as service subscription from Microsoft.

== See also ==
- Comparison of file hosting services
- Comparison of online backup services
