= List of services by MSN =

This is a list of services by MSN, the web portal and collection of Internet services by Microsoft:

== Current services ==
- MSN, the web portal and related apps
- MSN Dial-Up Internet Access, the Internet service provider (originally The Microsoft Network)
- MSN Games, a casual gaming website (previously Internet Gaming Zone)

== Rebranded ==
- Bing, a web search engine (previously MSN Search)
- Bing Ads, a business advertising service (previously MSN adCenter)
- Bing Maps, a maps website (previously MSN Expedia Maps and MSN Virtual Earth)
- Bing Shopping, a shopping website for online products (previously MSN Shopping)
- Messenger, an instant messaging client (previously MSN Messenger)
- Messenger service, its corresponding IM service (previously MSN Messenger Service)
- Microsoft account, a user login service (previously MSN Passport)
- Outlook.com, a webmail and calendar service (previously MSN Hotmail and MSN Calendar)
- Windows Live, the umbrella name under which several MSN services were rebranded

== Divested by Microsoft ==
- Expedia, a travel website
- MSNBC, a cable TV news channel
- NBCNews.com, a U.S. and world news website (previously msnbc.com)
- Nine.com.au, a localized version of the web portal in Australia (previously ninemsn)
- Sidewalk.com, a local event and city search website
- Slate, an online magazine

== Discontinued ==
- MSN Chat, a chat service and client
- MSN China, a localized version of the web portal in China
- MSN Companion, a personal computer terminal
- MSN Desktop Search, a search program for Windows
- MSN Direct, a radio service for electronic devices
- MSN Encarta, an encyclopedia
- MSN Groups, a collection of online communities
- MSN Music, a music service
- MSN QnA, a question-and-answer website
- MSN Soapbox, a video service
- MSN Spaces, a collection of blogs and personal websites
- MSN Toolbar, an add-on for Internet Explorer
- MSN TV, a set-top box for televisions
- MSN WiFi Hotspots, a service for locating Wi-Fi availability
- Xinmsn, a localized version of the web portal in Singapore
