= Windows Live Gallery =

Online marketplace for Microsoft Windows and Windows Live

- The Windows Live Gallery logo.
- Homepage
- Developer: Microsoft
- Final release: 13.0.1180.0516 / June 15, 2008; 18 years ago
- Type: Digital distribution marketplace
- Website: Archived official website at the Wayback Machine (archive index)

Windows Live Gallery (codenamed Customise) was an online digital distribution marketplace by Microsoft. During its operation, users could download desktop gadgets for Windows Vista and 7, web gadgets for pages such as Windows Live Home, additional third party buttons for Windows Live Toolbar, extras for Windows Live Messenger such as emoticons and activities, and add-ons for Microsoft Windows and Windows Live services.

Windows Live Gallery was launched on July 24, 2006, but was officially retired on October 1, 2011.

== History ==
Since its launch on July 24, 2006, Windows Live Gallery held repository for the following Windows and Windows Live services and products:

Service	Reason for removal from Windows Live Gallery
Gadgets for Live.com	Live.com's successor Windows Live Personalized Experience was discontinued on March 30, 2010
Gadgets for Windows Live Spaces and Windows Live Events	Gadgets on Windows Live Spaces were removed in June 2010, Windows Live Events discontinued on September 3, 2009
Live.com Collections	Live.com's successor Windows Live Personalized Experience was discontinued on March 30, 2010
Windows Live Toolbar Buttons and Custom Buttons	Windows Live Toolbar discontinued since the launch of Windows Live Essentials 2011 (Wave 4)
Windows Search add-ins and applications	Replaced by IFilters
Live Search Macros	Live Search Macros discontinued since the launch of Bing on June 3, 2009
Windows Live Agents	Windows Live Agents was discontinued in Summer 2009
Windows Live Messenger Emoticons, Winks, Display Pictures and Activities	Replaced by third-party services such as Quebles and WeeMee
Windows Live Writer add-ins	Replaced by http://plugins.live.com on December 13, 2010
Windows Desktop Gadgets	Discontinued in favor of Metro-styled apps in Windows 8. Several highest-rated gadgets remain available on Windows Personalization Gallery.
Windows SideShow	Discontinued in favor of Metro-styled apps in Windows 8.

== Developers ==
Windows Live Gallery integrated the Microsoft Points micropayment system which also powers Zune and Xbox Live purchases. It created a marketplace for developers to showcase their works, and if chose to, receive payment for their efforts. Developers who have partnered with Windows Live Gallery could set up their own virtual shops.

Jeff, Wei Jie, Junaid and Misha were generally regarded as the most prolific and critical members of the Gallery team.

== See also ==
- Windows Live
- Windows Live Dev
