= Windows Live Favorites =

- The Windows Live Favorites logo.
- Windows Live Favorites homepage
- Developer(s): Microsoft
- Final release: v1 / June 15, 2006
- Type: Favorites
- Website: Archived official website at the Wayback Machine (archive index)

Windows Live Favorites (codenamed Roaming Favorites) was a part of Microsoft's Windows Live range of services. It allowed users to access and edit their favorites from any computer. Users could import their bookmarks from Internet Explorer and MSN Explorer, add favorites by dragging and dropping, clicking the "Add Favorite" button on Windows Live Toolbar, or using the right-click menu. It also allowed users to find favorites more quickly using name, address, folders or tags. Windows Live Favorites allowed a total of 1000 favorites and folders per user account. Users were required to sign in with their Windows Live ID in order to use this service.

On April 14, 2009, Windows Live Favorites was integrated into Windows Live SkyDrive. All existing favorites were migrated to the "Favorites" and "Shared Favorites" folders on Windows Live SkyDrive.

== Features ==
Windows Live Favorites had the following features:

- Add and organize favorites for access anytime, anywhere
- Import existing local favorites by clicking the "Import" option
- There are a number of ways to add a favorite:
  - Click the Add option in the Add menu at the top of the page
  - Click on the "QuickAdd for Windows Live Favorites" Link to save it to the root directory of the user's favorites (available if a user has added the Favorites bookmarklet to their Links)
  - Right-click on a link in a web page and choose the "Add to Windows Live Favorites" option (available if a user has imported their Internet Explorer favorites)
- In-Line Preview allows users to preview their favorite web pages from within Windows Live Favorites
- Right-click enabled for any favorite to edit its properties
- Browse by Tags allow users to see a list of their tags and browse by them
- Real-time search allows users to start typing a search based on a favorite's name, folders, tags, and address and have their favorites filtered on the fly

== Integration ==
=== Windows Live Toolbar ===
Windows Live Favorites was available as an add-on to Windows Live Toolbar. This client allowed users to synchronize their favorites between Internet Explorer and Windows Live Favorites. However, this functionality has been removed since Windows Live Toolbar Wave 3 was released. Favorites syncing has since been replaced by Windows Live SkyDrive and Windows Live Mesh.

=== Windows Live Spaces ===
Using the Windows Live Favorites module in Windows Live Spaces, users were able to share their favorites to the public. Viewers can use the built-in search box to quickly find the favorites the users have shared.

=== Windows Live Messenger ===
A "Favorites Star" tab was available in Windows Live Messenger for users to easily access their favorites within the program. It supported folders and real-time search, and allows users to manage their favorites directly from the program.

=== Live.com ===
The Live.com Favorites gadget allowed users to access all of their favorites directly from their personalized Live.com page. Using this gadget it is possible to:

- Access favorites right from the Live.com personalized page
- View Top Favorites
- View Favorites organized by Tags
- View Favorites organized by Folders
- Search Favorites
- Add new links to Favorites
- Go to Windows Live Favorites management page

== See also ==
- Windows Live
- Windows Live Toolbar
- Windows Live SkyDrive
