= MSN =

Collection of Internet sites

- Current home page in June 2025
- Website type: Web portal
- Area served: Worldwide
- Owner: Microsoft (through Microsoft AI)
- Website: msn.com
- Commercial: Mixed
- Registration: Optional
- Launched: August 24, 1995; 31 years ago
- Current status: Active
- Written in: ASP.NET

MSN is a web portal and related collection of Internet services and apps provided by Microsoft. The main home page provides news, weather, sports, finance and other content curated from hundreds of different sources that Microsoft has partnered with. MSN is based in the United States and offers international versions of its portal for dozens of countries around the world. Its dedicated app is currently available for iOS and Android systems.

The first version of MSN launched on August 24, 1995, with the release of Windows 95, as a subscription-based dial-up online service called The Microsoft Network; it later became an Internet service provider named MSN Dial-Up Internet Access. Also around this time, the company launched a new web portal named Microsoft Internet Start and set it as the default home page of Internet Explorer, its web browser. In 1998, Microsoft renamed and moved this web portal to the domain name msn.com, where it has remained since.

Microsoft subsequently used the "MSN" brand name for a wide variety of products and services over the years, notably MSN Hotmail (later Outlook.com), MSN Messenger (which was once synonymous with "MSN" in Internet slang), its web search engine (which became Microsoft Bing), and several other rebranded and discontinued services. In 2014, Microsoft reworked and relaunched the MSN website and suite of apps offered. Following a partial rebranding of the website to Microsoft Start beginning in 2021, the company reversed course in 2024 and kept "MSN" as the name of the website.

== History ==
=== Microsoft Internet Start ===
MSN.com in Internet Explorer 1.0 on its initial launch day, August 24, 1995

MSN.com in October 1996, offering its "Custom Start Page" feature

From 1995 to 1998, the MSN.com domain was primarily used by Microsoft to promote The Microsoft Network as an online service and Internet service provider. During that period of time, MSN.com also offered a "Custom Start Page" and an Internet tutorial, but Microsoft's major public web portal of that era was known as "Microsoft Internet Start" and was located at home.microsoft.com.

Internet Start served as the default home page for Internet Explorer and offered basic information such as news, weather, sports, stocks, entertainment reports, links to other websites on the Internet, articles by Microsoft staff members, and software updates for Windows. Microsoft's original news website, MSNBC.com, which launched in 1996 (and was later divested by Microsoft as NBCNews.com), was also tied closely to the Internet Start portal.

=== MSN.com ===
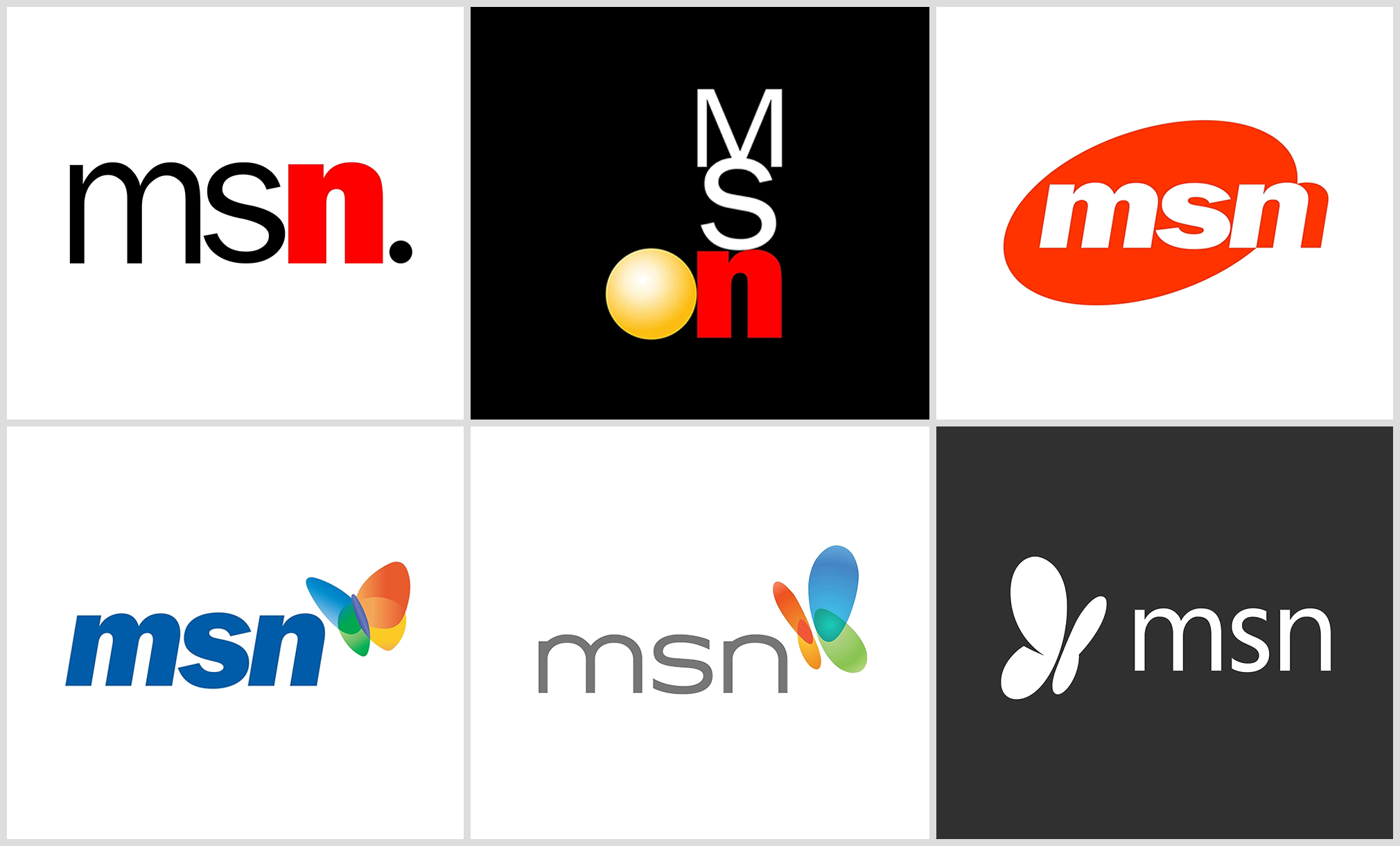
The MSN logo changed several times as the service evolved throughout its history (top row from left: 1995, 1996, 1998; and bottom row from left: 2000, 2009, 2014).

In 1998, the largely underutilized "MSN.com" domain name was combined with Microsoft Internet Start and reinvented as both a web portal and as the brand for a family of sites produced inside Microsoft's Interactive Media Group. The new website put MSN in direct competition with sites such as Yahoo!, Excite, and Go Network. Because the new format opened up MSN's content to the world for free, the Internet service provider and subscription service were renamed to "MSN Internet Access" at that time (that service eventually became known as MSN Dial-Up Internet Access).

The relaunched MSN.com contained a whole family of sites, including original content, channels that were carried over from 'web shows' that were part of Microsoft's MSN 2.0 experiment with its Internet service provider in 1996–97, and new features that were rapidly added. MSN.com became the successor to the default Internet Explorer start page, as all of the previous "Microsoft Internet Start" website was merged with MSN.com.

Some of the original websites that Microsoft launched during that era remained active in some form for decades. Microsoft Investor, a business news and investments service that was once produced in conjunction with CNBC, became MSN Money; CarPoint, an automobile comparison and shopping service, became MSN Autos; and the Internet Gaming Zone, a website offering online casual games, became MSN Games. Other websites since divested by Microsoft include the travel website Expedia, the online magazine Slate, and the local event and city search website Sidewalk.com.

In the late 1990s, Microsoft collaborated with many other service providers, as well as other Microsoft departments, to expand the range of MSN's services. Some examples include MSN adCenter, MSN Shopping (affiliated with eBay, PriceGrabber and Shopping.com), and the Encarta encyclopedia with various levels of access to information.

Since then, MSN.com remained a popular destination, launching many new services and content sites. MSN's Hotmail and Messenger services were promoted from the MSN.com portal, which provided a central place for all of MSN's content. MSN Search (which became Microsoft Bing), a dedicated search engine, launched in 1999. The single sign-in service for Microsoft's online services, Microsoft Passport (later Microsoft account), also launched across all MSN services in 1999.

The MSN.com portal and related group of services under the "MSN" umbrella remained largely the same in the early 2000s. This era also saw the introduction of the MSN butterfly logo on February 14, 2000, which went on to define the brand of all MSN services from that point forward.

The sports section of the MSN portal was ESPN.com from 2001 to 2004, and FoxSports.com from 2004 to 2014. MSN had an exclusive partnership with MSNBC.com for news content from 1996 until 2012, when Microsoft sold its remaining stake in msnbc.com to NBCUniversal and the website was renamed NBCNews.com. At the time, MSN launched "MSN News", an in-house news operation.

As of May 2005, MSN.com was the second most visited portal website in the United States with a share of 23.2 percent, behind Yahoo! which held a majority.

MSN released a preview of an updated home page and logo on November 3, 2009. It was originally expected to be widely available to over 100 million U.S. customers by early 2010. MSN rolled out the newer logo, together with a redesign of the overall website, on December 25, 2009.

In 2012, MSN announced on its blog that it would be unveiling a new version of the MSN.com home page on October 26, exclusively for Windows 8, saying that the new version would be "clean, simple, and built for touch". Microsoft said it would be more app-like due to the speed of Internet Explorer 10. More new features included "Flip Ahead", which allowed users to swipe from one article to the next. MSN for Windows 8 also had new deals with the AP and Reuters.

=== Rebranding of services ===
Many of MSN's services were reorganized in 2005 and 2006 under a new brand name that Microsoft championed at the time, Windows Live. This move was part of Microsoft's strategy to improve its online offerings using the Windows brand name. The company also overhauled its online software and services due to increasing competition from rivals such as Yahoo! and Google. The new name was introduced one service at a time. The group of Windows Live services used Web 2.0 technology to offer features and functionality through a web browser that were traditionally only available through dedicated software programs.

Some of the MSN services affected by the rebranding included MSN Hotmail, which became Windows Live Hotmail (now Outlook.com); MSN Messenger, which became Windows Live Messenger (later integrated into Skype); MSN Search, which became Live Search (now Microsoft Bing); MSN Virtual Earth, which became Live Search Maps (now Bing Maps); MSN Spaces, which became Windows Live Spaces; MSN Alerts, which became Windows Live Alerts; and MSN Groups, which became Windows Live Groups (and later OneDrive Groups). Some other services, such as MSN Direct, remained a part of the MSN family without transitioning to Windows Live.

Following the launch of Windows Live, the MSN brand took on a different focus. MSN became primarily an online content provider of news, entertainment, and common interest topics through its web portal, MSN.com, while Windows Live provided most of Microsoft's online software and services. In 2012, Microsoft began to phase out the Windows Live brand, referring to each service separately by its individual brand name without any "Windows" prefix or association.

=== Website redesign ===
MSN.com in September 2014, when its significant website redesign launched

Microsoft launched a completely rewritten and redesigned MSN website, making use of the company's modern design language, on September 30, 2014. The new MSN portal featured a new version of the logo that followed a style similar to other contemporary Microsoft products. The website no longer offered original content, instead employing editors to repurpose existing content from partners at popular and trusted organizations. Much of the existing content offered on MSN was eliminated as the website was simplified into a new home page and categories, some of which had corresponding apps:

- News: The latest news headlines and articles from a variety of hand-picked sources (synced with the MSN app).
- Weather: Current weather conditions, forecasts, maps, news, and traffic (synced with the MSN Weather app).
- Entertainment: TV, movies, music, and celebrity news, plus theater showtimes, tickets, and TV listings (based on the former Microsoft Bing service).
- Play: The MSN Games website offers online casual games (previously named "Internet Gaming Zone" and "MSN Gaming Zone").
- Sports: Up-to-the-minute scores, standings, and headlines from leagues worldwide (synced with the now-discontinued MSN Sports app).
- Money: Stock market tickers, watchlists, personal finance, real estate, investments, and currency converter (synced with the MSN Money app).
- Lifestyle: Headlines, features, and other content related to style, home & garden, family, smart living, relationships, and horoscopes.
- Health & Fitness: Tools and information about weight management, strength, exercise, nutrition, medicine, and more.
- Food & Drink: Recipes, cooking tips, news from chefs, cocktails, and shopping lists for food and drink items.
- Travel: Destinations, trip ideas, hotel search, flight search, flight status, and arrivals and departures (previously based on Farecast).
- Autos: Research and buying advice, auto-related news, information for enthusiasts, and coverage of auto shows worldwide.
- Video: Trending and viral videos, comedy and pop culture, and videos from other MSN categories (integrated with search from Bing Videos).

The top of the home page in 2014 provided access to services Microsoft Bing, Outlook.com, Skype, Office Online, OneNote, OneDrive, Bing Maps, and Groove Music, as well as popular social media services Facebook and Twitter. Signing into MSN with a Microsoft account allowed for personalized content to appear and to be synchronized across devices on the website and in the corresponding apps. The redesign of the website led to the closure of MSN's longtime personalized home page service "My MSN", which was made up of customized RSS feeds, as the new website no longer supported user-specified RSS content. However, it added some customizability, allowing each category on the home page to be reordered or hidden.

With the 2014 relaunch, MSN began supporting responsive design and eliminated the need for a separate mobile website. The redesign of MSN proved positive and helped increase traffic with an additional 10 million daily visitors after two months.

In 2021, Microsoft began phasing out MSN in favor of Microsoft Start, with an updated design, news pages being moved to Start, and ads for the website appearing on the homepage. This was reversed in November 2024, with the Microsoft Start page redirecting back to MSN. Microsoft also brought back the MSN app in November 2024.

== Apps ==
The MSN apps provide users information from sources that publish to MSN. Microsoft launched these apps along with the 2014 redesign of the MSN web portal, rebranding many of the Microsoft Bing apps that originally shipped with Windows 8 and Windows Phone in 2012. News, Weather, Sports, Money, and Travel first shipped with Windows 8, while Health & Fitness and Food & Drink first appeared in Windows 8.1. In December 2014, the apps became available across all the other major mobile device platforms as well: iOS, Android, and Fire OS. The apps have since been limited to fewer platforms.

The apps allowed users a reasonable amount of freedom to decide which sources provide information. Each app has its own color code that was used on the Windows live tile and internally. Originally, each app brought a unified experience with the MSN website and synchronized preferences across devices.

There are currently three apps: the MSN app, MSN Weather, and MSN Money. In July 2015, Microsoft announced the discontinuation of the Food & Drink, Health & Fitness, and Travel apps on all platforms, and that they would not be bundled with Windows 10; those apps, and Sports, are no longer offered.

=== MSN app ===
MSN
- Other names: Bing News (2012–2014); MSN News (2014–2018); Microsoft News (2018–2021); Microsoft Start (2021–2024)
- Developer: Microsoft AI
- Release: 26 October 2012; 14 years ago

Stable release(s) [±]
- Windows (Note: Microsoft Start was integrated into Microsoft Edge in 2023.): 4.56 (Build 21872.0) / July 24, 2026; 3 months ago
- Android: 32.6 (Build 43121100.6) / December 11, 2025; 10 months ago
- iOS: 33.8 (Build 44072700.1) / July 27, 2026; 3 months ago
- Operating system: Windows 11; Android 9+; iOS 16+; web; Discontinued: Android 8 (2025); Android 7 (2024); Windows 8.1, 10 (2023); Android 5, 6 (2020); Windows 8 (2019); Android Jelly Bean, KitKat (2018)
- Successor: Windows Web Experience Pack (for Windows)
- Type: News aggregator
- Website: www.microsoft.com/msn/mobile

The MSN app (on iOS and Android, alternatively named Microsoft News on Windows) is a news aggregator and service that features top news headlines and articles chosen by editors and automated systems. It includes news sections for top stories, U.S., world, money, technology, entertainment, opinion, sports, and crime, along with other miscellaneous stories. The app allows users to set their own personalized favorite topics and sources, receive notifications of breaking news through alerts, filter preferred news sources, and alter font sizes to make articles easier to read.

Development of the initial app began in May 2012, ahead of the Windows 8 Release Preview, and then it officially launched alongside Windows 8 on October 26, 2012. The app was originally named "Bing News" at the time of its launch in 2012, rebranded "MSN News" in 2014, again renamed "Microsoft News" in 2018, and once again relaunched as "Microsoft Start" on iOS and Android in 2021. In November 2024, Microsoft decided to retire the "Microsoft Start" branding and bring back the "MSN" name for the app. According to Windows Central, the company stated that this update was meant to simplify branding while keeping all existing functionalities unchanged.

Originally, the app included an RSS feed, but that capability was removed; Microsoft currently only allows users to subscribe to specified news sources, thereby curating news. The app used the chaseable live tile feature introduced in the Windows 10 Anniversary Update; if a user clicked on the Microsoft News Start menu tile when a particular story is shown, the user would see a link to that story at the top of the app when it launches.

=== MSN Weather app ===
MSN Weather

- Screenshot MSN Weather app on Windows 11
- Other names: Bing Weather (2012–2014)
- Developer: Microsoft
- Release: 26 October 2012; 14 years ago

Stable release(s) [±]
- Windows: 4.54 (Build 63045.0) / June 30, 2026; 4 months ago
- Android, discontinued: 30.2 (Build 24121200.5) / December 12, 2024; 22 months ago
- Operating system: Windows 10, 11; Windows Server 2012+; web; Discontinued: Android 5+ (2025); Windows 8, 8.1 (2024); Android Jelly Bean, KitKat (2022)
- Successor: MSN (for Android)
- Website: www.msn.com/weather

The MSN Weather app (originally named "Bing Weather") shows weather from a user's current location or any other location worldwide, and it allows users to define their favorite places, which will synchronize back to the Microsoft Start and across devices. Users can pin Weather tiles to the Start menu to see local weather conditions from multiple locations at a glance. It also offers satellite maps and has information regarding ski resorts. The app receives its weather conditions and forecasts from a variety of sources internationally. Weather uses weather conditions as the background, making it the only app that does not have a light/dark switch in Windows 10. Weather is not available for iOS; however, it came preinstalled on the Nokia 215 phone from Microsoft Mobile that ran Series 30+; it was the only feature phone to have the app built-in.

=== Discontinued apps ===
==== MSN Money app ====
MSN Money
- Developer: Microsoft
- Release: February 7, 2012; 14 years ago

Final release(s) [±]
- Windows: 4.53 (Build 63386.0) / December 6, 2024; 22 months ago
- Android: 29.2 (Build 42092000.2) / September 24, 2024; 2 years ago
- Operating system: Windows 10, 11, Android 8+
- Successor: MSN (for Android); Windows Web Experience Pack (for Windows)
- Website: Official website App for Windows; App for Android

The MSN Money app (originally a website named "MoneyCentral", and later "MSN MoneyCentral", and then "MSN Money" in the 2000s, prior to the app being relaunched in 2014 as a rebranding of "Bing Finance") allowed users to set up lists of publicly listed companies to watch, follow certain corporations and receive stock updates, get the latest headlines regarding international markets, view real-time trading figures with a 30-minute delay, track their own personal finances, calculate mortgages, get information on bonds and other financial assets, and convert currency.

Throughout 2025, its features were absorbed into the MSN Android app and the Windows Web Experience Pack, a system component app part of Windows NT responsible for Windows 11 widgets.

==== Other apps ====
The MSN Food & Drink app (originally named "Bing Food & Drink") was a recipe app that offered news related to foods and drinks, a personal shopping list that synchronized across devices and the web, and a wine encyclopedia that contained information on over 1.5 million bottles of wine, over 3.3 million tasting notes, and hundreds of cocktail recipes. Users could control the app hands-free, add their own recipes from physical cookbooks or personal recipes by snapping a photo, add notes to recipes, and sort the recipes into collections. The app also listed information from famous chefs according to their style of cuisine.

The MSN Health & Fitness app (originally named "Bing Health & Fitness") allowed users to track their calorie intake, look up nutritional information for hundreds of thousands of different foods, use a built-in GPS tracker, view step-by-step workouts and exercises with images and videos, check symptoms for various health conditions, and synchronize their health data to third-party devices such as activity trackers. MSN Health & Fitness formerly connected data with the Microsoft HealthVault, but it started using a Microsoft account with MSN's own cloud service to synchronize data when it was rebranded from Microsoft Bing to MSN. The app was not related to Microsoft's Xbox Fitness or Microsoft Health (the companion app for the Microsoft Band), despite being similar in function.

The MSN Travel app (originally named "Bing Travel") was a travel search engine that allowed users to book hotels and flights, aggregated travel-related news, and offered detailed information about thousands of travel destinations. Data in the app was powered by various travel websites, including Expedia, formerly owned by Microsoft. Other features included finding information on local restaurants, viewing pictures (including panoramas) and historical data about destinations, and reading reviews by previous travelers. If the user was signed in, Cortana could track flights and get hotel information through the app. MSN Travel was the only app in the suite that was exclusive to Windows. The app was discontinued in September 2015, but remained on the website for several years after that. The name "MSN Travel" was previously associated with Farecast, an airfare prediction website that Microsoft acquired in 2008.

The MSN Sports app (originally named "Bing Sports") displayed various sports scores and standings from hundreds of leagues around the world, as well as aggregated sports-related articles and news headlines. Sports also allowed the user to view slideshows and photo galleries, look up information about individual players and fantasy leagues, and set and track their favorite teams by selecting various topics from the menu. It also powered various predictive features within Microsoft's Cortana virtual assistant. It was discontinued on July 20, 2021, but remained on the website.

The MSN Esports Hub was a Microsoft Bing intelligence AI curated web app launched for the growing esports industry in 2020. Users could watch integrated streams from YouTube or Twitch. Microsoft's advanced AI called "Watch For", the algorithm originally made for Microsoft's Mixer was an artificial intelligence that used computer vision algorithms on livestreams so that it can alert the viewer of significant moments. This algorithm was implemented in the MSN Esports Hub. Users could also check a calendar for dates of upcoming esport events and tournaments. After the creation of the MSN Esports Hub, Microsoft acquired esports tournament platform "Smash.gg". Supported games included League of Legends, Valorant, Counter-Strike: Global Offensive, Dota 2, Overwatch, Fortnite Battle Royale, PlayerUnknown's Battlegrounds, Call of Duty: Modern Warfare, Tom Clancy's Rainbow Six Siege, Rocket League, FIFA, Gears of War, and Super Smash Bros. Ultimate. The service was replaced by Start.gg.

=== Older mobile apps ===
Microsoft first offered content from its MSN web portal on mobile devices in the early 2000s, through a service called Pocket MSN (in line with its Pocket PC products of the era) and later renamed MSN Mobile. The original MSN Mobile software was preloaded on many cell phones and PDAs, and usually provided access to legacy MSN services like blogs (MSN Spaces), email (Hotmail), instant messaging (MSN Messenger), and web search (now Microsoft Bing). Some wireless carriers charged a premium to access it. As many former MSN properties were spun off to Microsoft Bing, Windows Live, and other successors in the late 2000s, the Microsoft Mobile Services division took over the development of mobile apps related to those services.

In the meantime, Microsoft's MSN apps took on a more content-related focus, as did the web portal itself. Previous versions of MSN apps that were bundled with Windows Mobile and early versions of Windows Phone, as well as MSN apps for Android and iOS devices in the early 2010s, were primarily repositories for news articles found on MSN.com. Other earlier MSN mobile apps included versions of MSN Weather and MSN Money for Windows Mobile 6.5, MSN Money Stocks, and a men's magazine called "MSN OnIt" for Windows Phone 7.

After Microsoft's acquisition of Nokia's mobile phone division, Microsoft also started bundling MSN services with its Nokia-branded feature phones, though the only supported model was the Nokia 215. In addition to these apps, Microsoft developed a separate set of mobile apps specifically for MSN China.

== International ==
Microsoft's world headquarters is in the United States, so the main MSN website is based there. However, MSN has offered various international versions of its portal since its inception in 1995 for dozens of countries around the world. A list of international MSN affiliates is available on a web page named MSN Worldwide.

Following the redesign and relaunch of the MSN website in 2014, most international MSN websites share the same layout as the U.S. version and are largely indistinguishable from it, aside from their content. There were two exceptions: ninemsn, a longtime partnership between Microsoft and the Nine Network in Australia that launched in 1997 (Microsoft sold its stake in the venture in 2013 and ended its co-branding with Nine in 2016); and MSN China, an entirely customized version of MSN for China (Microsoft discontinued the portal in 2016, replacing it with a page that links to a number of other Chinese websites).
