= Bing Product Upload =

- Bing Product Upload homepage
- Developer(s): Microsoft
- Website: https://web.archive.org/web/20090619032221/http://www.bing.com:80/productupload/?

Bing Product Upload (codenamed Agora, formerly Windows Live Product Upload and Live Search Product Upload) was part of Microsoft's Bing search engine. It enabled online shoppers using Bing Shopping to find easily find merchant's products.

Product Upload helped merchants to upload their product catalogs in either text or XML file formats. It supported bulk uploads using FTP and browser-based uploads using HTTP. After the products were uploaded, they became visible to online shoppers using Bing Shopping. Shoppers were able to view prices, descriptions, and product images, and a direct link to the merchant's website to purchase their products. Merchants required a Windows Live ID to log in and sign up.

Bing Product Upload was discontinued on 15 May 2009.

== Features ==
=== Catalog Management ===
Merchants might upload their product catalogs in any of the formats supported: text or XML through either HTTP upload or FTP. Products could include images, description, price, and links to web addresses on the merchant's website. They could upload any number of catalogs with no specific limits. Once the catalog was successfully published and has passed the validation steps it would be searchable through Bing Shopping.

=== Reporting ===
Merchants could use Product Upload to keep up to date on the status of their catalogs and keep track of their products on Bing Shopping.

== See also ==
- Windows Live
- Bing Shopping
