= Windows Live Events =

Discontinued social event planner by Microsoft

- Windows Live Events logo.

- Windows Live Events Windows Live Events homepage
- Developer: Microsoft
- Final release: Wave 3 (Build 15.0.7581.0901) / December 2, 2008
- Type: Social events organization
- Website: Archived official website at the Wayback Machine (archive index)

A sample Windows Live Events page.

Windows Live Events was an online service by Microsoft as part of its Windows Live range of services that enabled users in Windows Live Spaces to share and plan different types of Events happening around them while collaborating with other services such as Windows Live Hotmail Calendar and Windows Live Spaces.

The service allowed users to plan and manage their own Events, add them to their Space, receive Alerts and integrate with other Windows Live services such as Calendar. It is similar to Facebook Events.

Windows Live Events disallowed new events to be created starting from September 3, 2009, however still allowed users to access their existing events after this date. The service was fully retired in April 2010 and replaced by Windows Live Hotmail Calendar.

== Features ==
Windows Live Events offered the following features:

- Create an event with a single setup page, and customize it with more than 100 templates as well as Windows Live Spaces modules
- Invite guests to the event, using Windows Live People contacts, or invite non-Windows Live ID users by using their email address
- Bing Maps integration to show location and directions to the event
- Send out customized invitation emails with links so invitees can view, collaborate, and share files and photos
- Integrate with Windows Live Hotmail Calendar and other third party calendar protocols, including iCal, Yahoo! Calendar and Google Calendar
- Manage discussion lists
- Share photos, files and comments with Windows Live Photos and Windows Live SkyDrive

== See also ==
- Windows Live
- Windows Live Spaces
- Windows Live Groups
