= Windows Live Call =

- The Windows Live Call logo.

- Screenshot Windows Live Call in Windows Live Messenger. Screenshot of Windows Live Call
- Developer(s): Microsoft
- Stable release: 2009 (Build 14.0.8064.0206) / February 12, 2009
- Operating system: Microsoft Windows
- Type: VoIP, Internet Phone service
- Website: Archived official website at the Wayback Machine (archive index)

Windows Live Call was part of Microsoft's Windows Live services. It integrated into Windows Live Messenger to allow users to make PC-to-PC and PC-to-Phone voice and video calls. Microsoft partnered with telecommunication companies around the world to allow users to use a PC equipped with a microphone and speakers and a high speed Internet connection to call almost any regular telephone anywhere in the world.

Windows Live Call offered three ways of calling:

- Computer Call - Free PC-to-PC voice calls to Windows Live Messenger contacts
- Video Call - Free PC-to-PC video calls to Windows Live Messenger contacts
- Phone Call - PC-to Phone voice calls to landline and wireless numbers anywhere in the world (charges applied)

The Phone Call service utilized Windows Live Messenger and Voice over Internet Protocol (VoIP) technology to provide users an inexpensive way to make domestic and international phone calls from a computer.

Microsoft also released the Windows Live Messenger Phone, which acts as an extension to Windows Live Messenger to make calls to other PC users or acts just like a normal telephone.

Windows Live Call was discontinued on June 1, 2010 because Windows Live Messenger Wave 4 release no longer supports VoIP functionalities. However, the "Computer Call" and "Video Call" features are still supported, in the forms of audio and video conversations respectively.

== Windows Live Messenger Phone ==
The Windows Live Messenger Phone was a two-line phone. The first line plugs into a wall jack similar to a regular home telephone. The second line is a USB connection to the PC. The base/charger stays near the PC but the handset is wireless, allowing users to take it across their room. The Windows Live Messenger Phone does not require any installation of drivers or control software. The only requirement to take full advantage of the phone is the latest version of Windows Live Messenger.

There are two ways users can make a call with the Windows Live Messenger Phone:

- Make a call using the local telephone service
- Users can also choose to open the Windows Live Messenger interface. The user's current contact list will be displayed on the phone's color screen, including the contact's display name and up-to-date information. Selecting a contact will give the user the choice to:
  - Call to PC - a free call anywhere in the world using the existing PC-to-PC calling feature
  - If there is a stored contact phone number, and the user has signed up for PC-to-Phone service, the user can call them anywhere in the world at discounted rates
  - If the user hasn't signed up for PC-to-Phone calling service, the user can still connect through their regular home phone service, as if they dialed their regular telephone

Additionally, when a contact calls from Windows Live Messenger, the Windows Live Messenger Phone will ring, display information about the caller, and allow the user to answer the call.

Currently Uniden and Philips have manufactured the Windows Live Messenger Phone.

== PC-to-Phone Partners ==
Verizon was the provider for the Windows Live Call PC-to-Phone service in the United States, but discontinued its Web Calling services for Windows Live Messenger as of September 1, 2008. Microsoft would instead partner with Telefonica to provide the service.

Other partners who hosted the Windows Live Call service included:

- Telefonica (USA, Argentina, Brazil, Chile, Colombia, Peru and Venezuela)
- NTT (Japan)
- LG Dacom (Korea)
- Chief Telecom (Taiwan)
- Bell Canada (Canada)

== See also ==
- Windows Live
- Windows Live Messenger
- Windows Live TV
- Skype
- Yahoo! Voice
- Comparison of VoIP software
