= Windows Live Writer =

Discontinued desktop blog-publishing application made by Microsoft

- Windows Live Writer
- Developer: Microsoft
- Final release: 2012 (v16.4.3528.331) / April 21, 2014; 12 years ago
- Written in: C#, C++
- Operating system: Windows 7 and later
- Platform: IA-32 and x64
- Available in: 64 languages
- Type: Blog software
- License: Freeware
- Website: writer.live.com at the Wayback Machine (archive index)

Windows Live Writer is a discontinued desktop blog publishing program that was developed by Microsoft and distributed as part of the Windows Live suite of apps. The last major release of Windows Live Writer was released in 2012 (end-of-life), and the software was completely discontinued in January 2017.

An open-source fork of Windows Live Writer was released as Open Live Writer on December 9, 2015.

== Functionality ==
The software featured WYSIWYG authoring, photo-publishing and map-publishing functionality, and was compatible with Windows Live Spaces, SharePoint blogs, Blogger, LiveJournal, TypePad, WordPress, Telligent Community, PBlogs.gr, JournalHome, the MetaWeblog API, the Movable Type API, Blogengine, Squarespace, and all blogs that supported Really Simple Discovery.

Windows Live Writer introduced the Provider Customization API that enables both rich customization of Windows Live Writer's behavior as well as the opportunity to add new functionality to the product. Windows Live Spaces, WordPress, and TypePad had all taken advantage of this API to expose additional service-specific features within Windows Live Writer.

Windows Live Writer was localized to 48 different languages.

== History ==
Windows Live Writer was based on Onfolio Writer, a product Microsoft obtained from the acquisition of Onfolio.

On November 6, 2007, version 2008 was released. It includes inline spell checking, table editing, ability to add categories, page authoring for WordPress and TypePad, support for excerpts and extended entries, improved hyperlinking and image insertion, and a new "Paste Special" function. Also improved integration to SharePoint 2007 support, new APIs enabling custom extensions by weblog providers, automatic synchronization of local and online edits, integration with Windows Live Gallery, and support for "Blogger Labels".

On December 15, 2008, Windows Live Writer version 2009 was released as part of the Windows Live Essentials suite.

Released on September 30, 2010, Windows Live Writer 2011 introduced the new Ribbon user interface.

On August 7, 2012, Windows Live Writer 2012 was released as part of the Windows Essentials 2012 suite. Version 2012 became the last major update to both the Windows Essentials suite and the Writer app.

On January 10, 2017, Windows Essentials 2012 and all its apps, including Windows Live Writer, reached the end of support, meaning it would no longer receive new features, bug fixes, and security updates. The software itself is also no longer available for download from Microsoft.

== Fork ==
A free and open-source fork of Windows Live Writer, known as Open Live Writer, has been released on GitHub on December 9, 2015.

== Gallery ==
Version 1.0.141 (Beta 1)

Internal version featuring the original Flair design

Windows Live Writer 2008

Windows Live Writer 2009
