= Bing xRank =

- Bing logo

- Bing xRank Homepage
- Developer(s): Microsoft
- Stable release: Final / June 3, 2009
- Type: Search engine
- Website: http://www.bing.com/xrank

Bing xRank (previously Live Search xRank) was a search service as part of Microsoft's Bing search engine. It kept track of notable celebrities, musicians, politicians, and bloggers and ranked them in order of popularity from Bing search query results. As of October 2010, Bing xRank has been shut down.

== Features ==
- xRank Today featured the top 10 movers on Bing xRank in the past 24 hours, popular topics section, and summary sections for each of the four xRank categories: Celebrities, Musicians, Politicians, and Bloggers
- xTreme Movers ranked the top search keywords on Bing in terms of search volume movement in the past 24 hours, and also showed a search volume graph of each of the top search keywords in the past 30 days
- On feature allowed users to compare two persons in the same category over their xRanks over the past 30 days
- Track the movements in rankings for the person of interest
- xRank History chart allowed users to view a notable person's popularity over the past six months
- Search and browse through a biography or get the latest news headlines about the notable person of interest
- Explore a notable person's latest videos, images, movies, or albums
- Displayed information about the relationships of the person of interest and its association with other notable persons

== See also ==
- Bing
- Windows Live
