= WLPG =

WLPG can refer to:

- Windows Live Photo Gallery
- WLPG (FM), an FM radio station licensed to Florence, South Carolina
