= Windows Live FrameIt =

- Windows Live FrameIt logo

- Windows Live FrameIt homepage
- Developer(s): Microsoft
- Preview release: Beta (Build 1.1.3015.0) / July 30, 2008
- Type: Digital photo frame extension
- Website: Archived official website at the Wayback Machine (archive index)

Managing contents in Windows Live FrameIt

Windows Live FrameIt was a Microsoft service under the Windows Live brand. It was aimed to extend the functionality of digital photo frames or any RSS enabled devices, allowing users to customise the content delivery from multiple sources. Users could use FrameIt to include information services such as weather forecasts and news, amongst their digital photos.

The beta version of the service was released on July 30, 2008. Windows Live FrameIt was discontinued on December 15, 2010.

== Features ==
Windows Live FrameIt allows the user to set up different feeds on the web, such as contents from Windows Live Spaces, Flickr, Facebook, or any RSS feed. Users may also schedule the day and time certain contents will be displayed in the digital photo frame.

The service partners with SmugMug to display contents in their default collections. Users may be able to customize their display settings such as the number of images, the display order, when the images are published, and the content's expiry date.

Windows Live FrameIt also allow contents to be shared between different users. Users can have a customized URL which can be given to any other users or inputted into supported digital photo frame devices for the feed that is being shared. If supported by the device, users may also set up a password to protect the privacy of their photos.
