= WLMM =

WLMM may refer to:

- Windows Live Movie Maker
- WLMM-LP, a defunct low-power radio station (103.9 FM) that was licensed to Channahon, Illinois, United States
