= Windows Essentials =

Freeware applications suite by Microsoft

- Windows Essentials applications - clockwise from the top left: Mail, Messenger, Photo Gallery and Movie Maker.
- Developer: Microsoft
- Release: August 25, 2006; 20 years ago
- Final release: 2012 (v16.4.3528.0331) / April 17, 2014; 12 years ago
- Operating system: Windows XP to Windows 10
- Type: Software suite
- License: Freeware
- Website: windows.microsoft.com/en-us/windows/essentials at the Wayback Machine (archived 2016-06-24)

Windows Essentials (formerly Windows Live Essentials and Windows Live Installer) is a discontinued suite of Microsoft freeware applications that includes email, instant messaging, photo sharing, blogging, and parental control software. Essentials programs are designed to integrate well with each other, with Microsoft Windows, and other Microsoft web-based services such as OneDrive and Outlook.com.

== Applications ==
Windows Essentials Applications
Edition	Windows Live Installer	Windows Live Essentials 2009	Windows Live Essentials 2011	Windows Essentials 2012
Photo Gallery	Yes	Yes	Yes	Yes
Movie Maker	No	Yes	Yes	Yes
Mail	Yes	Yes	Yes	Yes
Writer	Yes	Yes	Yes	Yes
OneDrive	No	No	Yes	Yes
Family Safety	Yes	Yes	Yes	Windows 7 only
Messenger	Yes	Yes	Yes	Yes
Toolbar	Yes	Yes	Replaced with Bing Bar	No
Mesh	No	No	Yes	No

Microsoft officially stated that Windows Essentials applications support installation on Windows 7, Windows 8, Windows 8.1, Windows Server 2008 R2, Windows Server 2012 and Windows Server 2012 R2, though some users demonstrated that it is installable on Windows 10 and Windows 11. Previous versions were also available on Windows XP and Windows Vista, and included Windows Live Messenger.

== History ==
=== Windows Live Installer (Wave 2) ===
The first appearance of a Windows Live Dashboard is seen with the initial "Windows Live Wave 2" unified installers from Windows Live Messenger 8.5, Mail and Writer that was released on May 30, 2007. In the "Windows Live Wave 2" suite of services, Windows Live Installer was the name of the website and software given to serve the purposes of allowing users to discover, download and install Windows Live software and services. Users were able to select the Windows Live software they wished to install on the website, and the website would pass on the information to the unified installer software such that the installer will only download and install those applications selected.

=== Windows Live Essentials 2009 (Wave 3) ===
The Windows Live Installer application was significantly updated with the subsequent "Windows Live Wave 3" release of applications, with the new inclusion of Windows Live Movie Maker (beta) and Microsoft Office Outlook Connector to its suite of products. On October 29, 2008, it was announced at the Professional Developers Conference 2008 that Windows Live Installer would be renamed as Windows Live Essentials, and would be integrated into Windows 7 to allow users to download the included Windows Live applications. However, the Windows Live Essentials applications will not be "bundled" with the Windows 7 operating system. This should allow more frequent updates to the Windows Live Essentials applications outside of major operating system releases.

On December 15, 2008, the "beta refresh" versions of Windows Live Essentials applications were released. This release included many changes since the previous beta release based on user feedback. A significant visual change in this release was the introduction of new application icons which added a common design theme to all the Live Essentials applications. The words "beta" were removed from most of the build numbers. On January 7, 2009, the "beta refresh" versions were released as the final versions, with the notable exception of Windows Live Movie Maker.

Microsoft updated Windows Live Essentials Wave 3 on February 13, 2009 and again on August 19, 2009, when Windows Live Movie Maker was released out of beta and significantly updated with additional features since the beta version released in December 2008. The final build number was 14.0.8117.0416.

After the release of Windows Live Essentials 2011, which dropped support for Windows XP, Windows Live Essentials 2009 was renamed to Windows Live Essentials for Windows XP and was made available for Windows XP users to help maintain the product user base. Some applications, such as Windows Live Movie Maker, were not included with Windows Live Essentials for Windows XP.

=== Windows Live Essentials 2011 (Wave 4) ===
Photo Gallery 2011 with the ribbon user interface displaying numerous image editing options

Microsoft released a public beta for the next major update for Windows Live Essentials dubbed "Wave 4" on June 24, 2010. The updated applications include Windows Live Messenger, Mail, Photo Gallery, Movie Maker, Writer, Family Safety, Mesh, and Messenger Companion. For Windows Live Mesh, the application has been rewritten to be based on the previous Live Mesh and will allow PC and Mac users to keep their documents, pictures and music in sync across multiple computers. It was also announced that Windows Live Toolbar will be discontinued and replaced by the Bing Bar. In addition, the ribbon user interface was incorporated into Mail, Photo Gallery, and Writer. The Wave 4 beta has dropped support for Windows XP; Windows Vista or Windows 7 is required for its use. The beta refresh of Windows Live Essentials 2011 was released on August 17, 2010. Microsoft released the final version of Windows Live Essentials 2011 on September 30, 2010. The applications were updated with a hotfix/QFE (except for Mesh and Family Safety) on December 1, 2010, and that update became available through Windows Update from March 20, 2011. On May 2, 2012, Microsoft announced the re-branding of Windows Live. Although all applications in Windows Live Essentials 2011 suite will continue to function on Windows Vista, 7, and 8, there will be no significant updates made to these applications in the future. In June 2014, Microsoft announced that Windows Live Essentials 2011 would no longer be available for download on Windows Vista.

=== Windows Essentials 2012 (Wave 5) ===
Microsoft released Windows Essentials 2012 on August 7, 2012, for Windows 7 and Windows 8 users. Windows Essentials 2012 included SkyDrive for Windows (later renamed OneDrive), and dropped Windows Live Mesh, Messenger Companion and Bing Bar. Microsoft Family Safety is also installed for Windows 7 users only, as Windows 8 has built-in family safety functionalities. Further, Windows Essentials 2012 also dropped the "Windows Live" branding from the installer itself, as well as from programs such as Photo Gallery and Movie Maker, which have been branded Windows Photo Gallery and Windows Movie Maker respectively. These two programs have also received several updates and enhancements since their 2011 release, including video stabilization, waveform visualizations, new narration tracks, audio emphasizing, default save as H.264 format, and enhanced text effects for Movie Maker; as well as AutoCollage integration and addition of Vimeo as a publishing partner for Photo Gallery. No significant changes or re-branding were made in this release for other programs such as Windows Live Messenger, Windows Live Mail, and Windows Live Writer. While the program is no longer available for download by Microsoft, it is still possible today to download the original pack for Windows Essentials 2012. Such links are provided in the form of links to the Wayback Machine, and the suite can also be found on the Internet Archive.

== Deprecation ==
On May 2, 2012, a blog post published by the Windows 8 engineering team announced that the Windows Essentials suite would be replaced by features built into Windows 8. Despite this, the suite remained officially supported on Windows 8 and 8.1.

Some of the apps included in the package are unsupported on Windows 8.1 and 10 and are removed after an upgrade. The Facebook integration in Photo Gallery and Movie Maker broke due to Facebook API changes. From April 2017, Microsoft began to close Windows Live Messenger, redirecting users to Skype; the installer has not been updated to reflect this change. Windows Live Mail no longer works with Outlook.com using the proprietary DeltaSync protocol due to removal of support for the latter from Outlook.com, but can be configured to use such accounts using either IMAP or POP3 protocols. Windows Live Writer no longer works with Blogger due to Blogger's authentication API changes. The suite had otherwise not received a major upgrade since 2012, and it had not received any updates through Windows Update since 2014, although Microsoft offered a downloadable (albeit buggy) update in December 2015. Microsoft announced that the suite would be officially retired on January 10, 2017, and would no longer be available for download, and that after the end of support date applications already installed would continue to work but with "an increased security risk associated with use of unsupported products past their end of support date."

In 2015, following user campaigns for Windows Live Writer to be continued, Microsoft released the source code to Windows Live Writer under an open-source license. On December 9, 2015, .NET Foundation announced an open-source fork, named Open Live Writer.
