= Windows Photo Gallery =

Photo organiser software

- Windows Photo Gallery 2012
- Developer: Microsoft
- Stable release: 2012 (v16.4.3528.331) / April 18, 2014; 12 years ago
- Operating system: Windows 7, Windows Server 2008 R2, Windows 8, Windows 10
- Platform: x86-compatible with SSE2
- Successor: Microsoft Photos
- Type: Image organizer, image viewer, raster graphics editor and photo sharing
- License: Freeware
- Website: Archived official website at the Wayback Machine (archive index)

Windows Photo Gallery (known as Windows Live Photo Gallery from 2007-2011) is a discontinued image viewer and image organizer by Microsoft for its Windows operating system. It is a part of Microsoft's Windows Essentials software suite.

Key features included photo management with tagging and metadata support, basic photo editing capabilities, and integration with online services such as OneDrive, Flickr, and Facebook for easy sharing.

The product has been unavailable for download since January 10, 2017, as the Windows Essentials line of products have been discontinued.

== Features ==
Windows Photo Gallery provides management, tagging, and searching capabilities for digital photos. It provides an image viewer that can replace the default OS image viewer, and a photo import tool that can be used to acquire photos from a camera or other removable media. Windows Photo Gallery also allows sharing of photos by uploading them to OneDrive, Windows Live Groups, Flickr and Facebook.

=== Photo management ===
Windows Photo Gallery provides the ability to organize digital photo collection in its Gallery view, by adding titles, rating, captions, and custom metadata tags to photos. There is also limited support for tagging and managing video files, though not editing them.

Windows Photo Gallery uses the concept of hierarchical tagging (e.g. People/Jim, Places/Paris) to organise photos. Deleting a tag from Windows Photo Gallery will also remove it from all photos in the utility. Adobe Systems's Extensible Metadata Platform (XMP) metadata standard, a descendant of the ubiquitous Exif standard which almost all digital cameras currently support, is also supported. This allows for data such as the tags to be stored and edited much more efficiently than EXIF or IPTC.

Since Windows Live Photo Gallery 2011, geotagging and people tagging (with facial detection and recognition) is also supported. For some supported image file types, People Tags can be read and saved using the Microsoft People Tag XMP Schema.

=== Photo editing ===
Windows Photo Gallery allows photos to be edited for exposure or color correction. It also provides other basic photo editing functions, such as resizing, cropping, and red-eye reduction. Users can view a photo's color histogram, which allows them to adjust the photo's shadows, highlights and sharpness. Further, Windows Photo Gallery also includes editing tools such as blemish remover and noise reduction.

Photo editing technologies developed by Microsoft Research, including Panoramic stitching, Photo Fuse (formerly known as Group Shot), and AutoCollage are also included in Windows Photo Gallery.

Windows Photo Gallery also supports the ability to batch resize photos, where multiple photos can be resized in one single action, as well as the ability to rotate videos.

=== Photo and video import ===
Windows Photo Gallery's photo/video import tool provides the ability to view, select, and tag photos that are automatically grouped by date-taken.

=== Format support ===
Windows Photo Gallery is based on the PIX engine which uses the Windows Imaging Component (WIC) library. The application has native metadata handling and tagging support and since the Windows Imaging Component is extensible, it can organize and view any image format for which a third party WIC codec is installed. Therefore, the supported formats depend on the Windows version, additional WIC codecs for QuickTime/raw image formats/Webp, and platform updates, e.g., JPEG (.jpg, .jpeg), BMP (.bmp), PNG (.png), TIFF (.tif and .tiff), HD Photo .wdp (later replaced by JPEG XR .jxr), and GIF(.gif) images, as well as most common video formats. Windows Photo Gallery uses the Windows Color System. Legacy image formats such as PCX and WMF without WIC codec cannot be viewed. For animated GIFs only individual frames are shown.

== History ==
=== Digital Image Photo Library 9 ===
The application started development in December 2001 as a new "Photo Library" offering (code named "POD") that was added to the established "Picture It!" product. Both programs are part of the Microsoft Digital Image image editing and organizing suite. This was the first photo organization and management tool offered by Microsoft, and was released alongside the Digital Image Editor raster graphics editor with Digital Image Suite 9 on June 3, 2003.

=== Digital Image Photo Library 10 ===
The second version was released on June 12, 2004.

=== Digital Image Photo Library 11 ===
The third and final version branded Photo Library was released April 22, 2005. A further "Anniversary edition" that included Windows Vista compatibility fixes was released August 18, 2006.

Windows Photo Gallery in Windows Vista

=== Windows Photo Gallery ===
The first version of Windows Photo Gallery was included with all editions of Windows Vista and replaced Windows Picture and Fax Viewer. Themed photo slideshows with smooth transitions were only available in the Home Premium and Ultimate editions.

=== Windows Live Photo Gallery (Wave 2) ===
In 2007, a new version of Windows Photo Gallery would be released separately for Windows Vista and XP in Windows Live Installer, under the name of "Windows Live Photo Gallery". The first version of the Windows Live Photo Gallery beta was released on June 27, 2007, and the last version released on November 6, 2007.

=== Windows Live Photo Gallery 2009 (Wave 3) ===
Windows Live Photo Gallery 2009 came out in beta with the rest of Windows Live Essentials 2009 beta in September 2008, with a new interface based on Windows 7. On December 15, 2008, the "beta refresh" versions of Windows Live Essentials 2009 applications were released including Photo Gallery. This release included many changes since the previous beta release based on user feedback. A significant visual change in this release was the introduction of a new application icon which added a common yellow energy line theme to all the Windows Live Essentials applications and services. The words "beta" was removed from the build number. On January 7, 2009, the "beta refresh" versions were released as the final versions, with the exception of Windows Live Movie Maker, and was the last version for Windows XP.

With the release of Windows 7, Microsoft decided not to bundle Photo Gallery within the operating system. Instead, Windows 7 came bundled with a software called Windows Photo Viewer, a downgraded version which removes the editing, gallery, and organization capabilities. The full suite of Photo Gallery was released as part of the Windows Live Essentials software suite instead.

=== Windows Live Photo Gallery 2011 (Wave 4) ===
Windows Live Photo Gallery 2011 beta was released by Microsoft, along with the rest of Windows Live Essentials 2011 beta, on June 24, 2010. The 2011 version features new additions such as batch people tagging, blemish remover and noise reduction. The beta refresh was released on August 18, 2010, and the final version of Windows Live Photo Gallery 2011 was released as part of the final version of Windows Live Essentials 2011 on September 30, 2010. It was updated with a hotfix (along with the rest of Essentials except for Mesh and Family Safety) on December 1, 2010.

New features in Windows Live Photo Gallery 2011 include addition of a ribbon to the user interface, batch processing, a clone tool, facial recognition, geotagging with support for Bing Maps, image stitching, and noise reduction. Windows Live Photo Gallery 2011 also integrates with Facebook, Flickr, OneDrive, YouTube, and the now defunct Picasa Web Albums and Windows Live Spaces to facilitate file uploads to online services.

=== Windows Photo Gallery 2012 (Wave 5) ===
The Wave 5 version was released on August 7, 2012, as Windows Photo Gallery 2012; Microsoft dropped the Live branding from its title. Windows Photo Gallery 2012 introduced an AutoCollage feature that allow users to automatically create a collage of their images, as well as the ability to publish videos to Vimeo.
