= Life in the Dorms =

2012 click-and-point adventure video game

- Developer: Moment Games
- Designers: Ted Hung; Paul Franzen
- Platforms: Xbox Live Arcade; Steam
- Release: 2012
- Genre: Point-and-click adventure
- Mode: Single-player

Life in the Dorms is a comedic point and click adventure game developed by American and Australian indie studio Moment Games and released in 2012. It is on the Xbox LIVE Indie Channel, and was original priced at 80 Microsoft points ($1).

== Plot ==
"Life in the Dorms" stars "a paranoid college freshman. Join Dack Peeples as he deals with typical dorm-life issues, such as attending orientation, meeting his roommate for the very first time, hunting down serial killers and kidnappers, performing open surgery…and discovering the many surprising uses for ramen noodles."

== Gameplay ==
As a point and click game, "Life in the Dorms" shares many staples of the genre including collecting items which are stored and used later to complete puzzles.

== Critical reception ==
Adventure Gamers rated it 2.5 stars, writing "You certainly won't be missing a classic if you skip it, but for Xbox fans starved for adventure, Life in the Dorms is an admirable comedic effort that works enough of the time to consider its student-friendly price tag." In a negative review, Indie Gamer Ckick said "This is one of the most clunky, cumbersome, awful interfaces I've ever seen. It's like Life in the Dorms is overdosing from that slow-motion drug from Dredd. I just want to move the plot forward with as little resistance as possible. Yet every rinky dinky action requires Dack to turn and face the camera to address the situation, in what I can only guess is an attempt to break down the fourth wall." Rating the game a 6 out of 10, ThisIsXbox summed up its review saying "Life in the Dorms has its ups and downs. It has a pretty cool graphical style with sprites that sort of resemble Xbox LIVE Avatars. The storyline isn't bad and most of the characters are unique rather than just flat cardboard cutouts. On the other hand, the game progresses at such a leisurely pace that if you aren't already a fan of the point-and-click genre in general, you probably aren't going to have much fun with this game. It doesn't help things that the same background music just drones on and on and on the whole time."
