= MSN Groups =

Defunct social network by Microsoft

- Home page of MSN Groups
- Website type: Online communities
- Dissolved: 2009
- Owner: Microsoft
- Website: groups.msn.com
- Registration: Optional
- Launched: 1995
- Current status: Discontinued

MSN Groups is a defunct social networking website created by Microsoft as a part of the MSN brand of services that hosted online communities containing web pages, images, and message boards. The website was shut down on February 21, 2009, as part of a migration of online applications and services to the Windows Live brand. Windows Live Groups, a part of the Windows Live branding, was never marketed as, or intended to be a replacement for, MSN Groups.

== History ==
Since 1995, there were various communities on MSN, all run by MSN, featuring real newsgroups and IRC chat rooms. They were not easily updatable as only MSN Communities staff members could update the one page that each "community" had. There was one for every generic interest. Around 1998–99, MSN created the home pages, which were real Web sites much like Tripod or GeoCities. These had no message boards or chat rooms attached. MSN did away with these home pages around 2001–02, not too long after they introduced the Custom Pages and File cab (later referred to as Documents) in MSN Communities, which were later called Groups.

Besides the general content and community that many of these groups provided, they would compete for the top ten rankings. Some of the largest groups in the site, often rising to the number 1 spot, included Debate, Critical Thinking and Philosophy, RaVaged, The Meaning of Life, ChristianTeen777, and Community Feedback for Dummies.

The "make your own group" feature came along in summer of 1999, when MSN did away with the real newsgroups IRC chat rooms. Message boards, chat rooms, one customizable home page and photo albums were added. Gradually, the list pages, custom pages and documents pages were added. Some groups had icons displayed next to the name. Official groups by MSN had the MSN "butterfly", groups considered "cool" had "sunglasses", private groups had a "padlock" and Mature groups had the "smoking pipe". Previously, "Adult" groups had their own icon too.

In 2005, all "Adult" groups were transferred to the World Groups web site. Creating or changing a group to "Adult" was no longer possible in MSN. The removal of all "Adult" groups was processed on November 28, 2005. On October 16, 2006, the chats on every MSN Group were removed during the cancellation of the MSN Chat service. MSN Groups Chat rooms were removed from the CMS because MSN Subscription Chat was no longer profitable, and because of security and safety issues for children.

== Features ==
- Members of MSN Groups can use and contribute to message boards, document folders, photo albums and list pages. Some areas may only be accessible to administrators/managers.
- A custom web page gives the user the choice to use the WYSIWYG interface or HTML. MSN limits some HTML code from being used and JavaScript cannot be put onto any page due to security concerns. In the WYSIWYG interface there are tools to add pictures, select background and text colours, create tables, emoticons, fonts, paragraphs, text sizes etc.
- Each group created comes with a default message board called "General". Other message boards can be created for other topics. Members can participate in the group by adding messages and replying using the same interface as used for creating a custom web page. Alternatively, an e-mail can be sent to the group's e-mail address and the message will appear on the General message board. To reduce spam only e-mails from members can be sent. So, even if a member from a group sends a message he or she will need to use the e-mail address specified in their profile. Some groups discourage dmembers from disclosing their e-mail address due to spoofing. The group may have certain guidelines to tell members not to have their e-mail on display in their profile. There was also a separate e-mail address which can be used to contact administrators only.
- All groups are expected to comply with MSN's, and have various guidelines for membership of the individual groups. Members who do not comply with group rules may have their membership cancelled or be permanently banned.
- Documents folders are for storage and can be made accessible to members or just administrators but not non-members. In adding a file to a documents folder this contributes to the member's storage limit. A photo album can also be created for storing photos and images for the site. These images can be put on a custom web page and on the message boards. Adding images also contributes to the storage limit. Uploading images and documents requires the ActiveX control to be installed. The storage limit was 3 MB across all groups and can be upgraded to 30 MB if the person upgrades to MSN Hotmail Plus (fee). However, on MSN Spaces an unlimited amount of images can be added without the need of paying. So, images can be hotlinked as they are on the MSN domain.
- Organizing events for the group can be done by using the Calendar page. This embeds the calendar as used in MSN Hotmail. Depending on the settings members may be able to contribute to it. Special pages can also be created for lists and links. Again, depending on the settings members may or may not be able to add it.
- If a group was placed in a specific category (such as Xbox or MSN Messenger) then a theme was automatically applied. Instead of the default violet-colored bar at the top it will be a themed bar and message boards will contain different colored buttons. Some themes are restricted to groups created in the United States, although there was a workaround to pass this restriction.

== Closure ==
In October 2008, Microsoft announced the MSN Groups Service would close down on February 21, 2009. Users would still be able to retain their information even with the closure. Users had the option of migrating their data to the social website Multiply, MSN's partner for online groups. MSN Groups would not become Windows Live Groups, as the tools that could be possibly utilized differed from that of the MSN Groups features. Windows Live Groups were not being launched as or marketed as a replacement for MSN Groups. MSN groups were decommissioned as part of the dismantling of the services side of MSN. The only official option Groups were given was the opportunity to migrate to Multiply. Windows Live Groups were integrated into Windows Live Messenger and Windows Live Spaces and do not have the capacity to accommodate the large memberships of MSN groups.

In 2012, those who migrated their groups to Multiply were informed that the site was switching focus to e-commerce and would no longer host personal websites.

== See also ==
- Google Groups
- Windows Live Groups
- Yahoo Groups
