= WLWM =

WLWM may refer to:

- WLWM-LP, a low-power radio station (105.7 FM) licensed to serve Charlestown, New Hampshire, United States
- WHPA (FM), a radio station (89.7 FM) licensed to serve Macomb, Illinois, United States, which held the call sign WLWM from 2009 to 2012
- Windows Live Web Messenger
