= Microsoft Live =

The following Microsoft services have been branded with the word "Live":

- Windows Live, a set of services and software products mainly aimed at individuals
- Microsoft Office Live, a set of services aimed at small businesses
- The Live Anywhere initiative, aimed to bring a unified online gaming and entertainment network together
  - Xbox Live, for Xbox and Xbox 360
  - Games for Windows – Live, for various Windows platforms.
- Live Services, a set of tools for developers of Windows Live and Azure Services Platform
  - Live Mesh, a software as a service platform that enables PCs and other devices to connect with each other through the internet
  - Live Framework, a REST-based application programming interface for accessing the Live Mesh services over HTTP
