= LG Cosmos 3 =

- Brand: LG
- Manufacturer: LG Electronics
- Series: LG Cosmos
- First released: May 2013
- Predecessor: LG Cosmos 2
- Compatible networks: CDMA 1.9 GHz PCS, 800 MHz Digital Dual-Band
- Form factor: Slider with 4-line QWERTY keyboard
- Dimensions: 4.41 in (112.0 mm) (H) x 2.06 in (52.3 mm) (W) x 0.63 in (16.0 mm) (D)
- Weight: 4.58 oz (129.8 g)
- Storage: Expandable via microSD up to 32 GB
- Battery: 900 mAh (Standard); 1,800 mAh (Extended)
- Rear camera: 1.3 megapixels (1280 x 960 max resolution); 2x digital zoom
- Display: 2.0-inch TFT LCD, 262K colors 320 x 240 pixels (200 PPI)
- Connectivity: Bluetooth 2.1 + EDR, Micro-USB, 3.5 mm headset jack
- Model: VN251S
- Development status: Discontinued
- Other: S-GPS, BREW, 1xRTT Data, Facebook updates

The LG Cosmos 3 is a feature phone branded and manufactured by LG Electronics in May 2013. It features a 2-inch TFT display, a side-sliding, QWERTY keypad, a 1.3-megapixel rear camera, a Bluethooth, a 900 mAh battery which provides 6 hours of talk time, and an expandable storage up to 32GB via microSD.

== Features ==
- Web browsing: Myriad 6.2 (WAP pages only)
- Mail accounts: Gmail, Hotmail, Microsoft Exchange, Verizon.net, Windows Live, and Yahoo
- Available languages: English, Spanish, Chinese, and Korean

== Reception ==
The camera, the battery capacity, and the 2-inch display is used just like its predecessor. In terms of design, there is a lack of thinness, which users can fit in their pocket without any bulges.

The camera app takes about 2 and a half seconds to open.
