= Yahoo Groups =

Collection of online discussion boards (created 2001; closed 2020)

Yahoo! Groups
- Website type: Electronic mailing lists and Internet forums
- Dissolved: December 15, 2020; 5 years ago
- Owner: Yahoo!
- Website: Archived official website at the Wayback Machine (archive index)
- Commercial: Yes
- Launched: January 30, 2001; 25 years ago
- Current status: Defunct

Yahoo! Groups was a free-to-use system of electronic mailing lists offered by Yahoo!.

Prior to February 2020, Yahoo! Groups was one of the world's largest collections of online discussion boards. It allowed members to subscribe to various groups, read subscribed discussions online, view and share photos, files and bookmarks within a group, access a group calendar, create polls for group members, and receive email notifications of new discussion topics. Some groups were simply announcement boards, to which only the group moderators could post, while others were discussion forums. Depending on each group's settings, membership could be open to everyone or only to invited or approved people.

On February 1, 2020, Yahoo! removed online access to discussions and all other features except simple membership management, essentially turning all groups into mailing lists, and on October 13, 2020, it announced that Yahoo Groups would shut down completely on December 15, 2020.

== History ==
In 1998 Yahoo! Clubs was launched as an extension of services developed by Yahoo! Messenger. In August 2000 Yahoo acquired eGroups.com. Yahoo! Groups was launched in early 2001 as an integration of technology from eGroups.com and community groups from both eGroups.com and Yahoo! Clubs.

In 2001 Yahoo! deleted adult groups from its search directory, making it very difficult to locate Yahoo! groups with adult content. The Groups Updates Email feature was introduced in 2010. It summarized, in a single email, all the updates that occurred every twenty-four hours in all groups.

In September 2010, a major facelift was rolled out, making Yahoo! Groups look very similar to Facebook.

Former Yahoo! Groups logo, used from 2009 until 2013.

Former Yahoo! Groups logo, used from 2013 until 2019.

In December, Yahoo! Groups Japan emailed its users and posted a notice on its homepage, to announce that its service, which commenced in February 2004, would be closing on May 28, 2014.

In October 2019, Yahoo! announced that all content that had been posted to Yahoo! Groups will be deleted on December 14, 2019; that date was later amended to January 31, 2020. Yahoo! announced that adding new content would be blocked on October 28, 2019.

Once the content was deleted, users of Yahoo! Groups were only able to browse the group directory, request invitations and, if members of a group, send messages to that group.

On October 13, 2020, Yahoo! announced they would be shutting down Yahoo! Groups on December 15, 2020. The site was closed down a few days after the advertised date, displaying a message that the service was officially shut down. This message stopped appearing at the end of January 2021 and the Yahoo! Groups web address began redirecting to the main Yahoo! page.

=== Criticism and controversy ===
On August 31, 2010, Yahoo! Groups started rolling out a major software change, which was denounced by a large number of users. The re-model was completely abandoned on January 12, 2011.

== Site statistics ==
In August 2008, Yahoo! Group staff reported that there were 113 million users, and nine million Groups using 22 languages.

In July 2010, the web analytics website Quantcast reported around 915 thousand unique visitors daily to the Yahoo! Groups website (US). In January 2011, that number had increased to 933 thousand unique visitors daily. The number did not include Yahoo! Group members who accessed the Groups site via email.

In September 2010, at its "Product Runway" event, Yahoo! told reporters that Yahoo! Groups had 115 million group members and that there were 10 million Yahoo! groups.

== See also ==
- Google Groups
- Meetup
- MSN Groups (closed)
- OneDrive Groups (closed)
- Usenet
