= Windows Live Web Messenger =

Browser-based instant messaging 2004–2008

- Screenshot of Windows Live Web Messenger beta
- Website type: Instant messaging
- Owner: Microsoft
- Website: Archived official website at the Wayback Machine (archive index)
- Commercial: No
- Registration: Required
- Launched: August 2004; 22 years ago
- Current status: Discontinued (October 30, 2008)

Windows Live Web Messenger is the discontinued browser-based version of Windows Live Messenger developed by Microsoft which allowed users to send instant messages online and in real-time with others using the Microsoft Messenger service from within a web browser. The service allowed users without administrative privileges on their computer, such as at a shared public computer, to chat with others on their Messenger contact list without having to install the Windows Live Messenger client.

On October 30, 2008, Microsoft officially discontinued the beta version of Windows Live Web Messenger and integrated the service into Windows Live Hotmail and Windows Live Contacts. In 2010, as part of the Windows Live "Wave 4" release, Windows Live Web Messenger is integrated into all Windows Live web services' headers, allowing users to sign into the Messenger service via the web browser on any Windows Live properties.

== History ==
MSN Web Messenger was first launched in August 2004. On the contact list for MSN Messenger users, the status of a contact using Web messenger is either displayed as a globe, or by appending the word (Web) after their name, depending on the version of MSN Messenger used. MSN Web Messenger was officially discontinued on June 30, 2009.

In September 2007, Microsoft began developing a new version of the service named Windows Live Web Messenger. This version was released to internal beta testers and was not available to the public. Windows Live Web Messenger featured the Windows Live 2.0 user interface, integrated Personal Status Message and display picture functionalities, and allowed tabbed conversations in a "conversation workspace". Windows Live Web Messenger was officially discontinued on October 30, 2008, and its capabilities were integrated into Windows Live Hotmail and Windows Live Contacts. However many functionalities in the beta version of Windows Live Web Messenger, such as tabbed conversations, were unavailable in the Windows Live Contacts and Hotmail version.

There are other services from various localities (such as China, Taiwan, and Singapore) that are also titled Windows Live Web Messenger, however these versions are only an implementation of the Windows Live Messenger Web Toolkit.
