= Windows Live Expo =

- The Windows Live Expo logo.

- Windows Live Expo homepage
- Developer: Microsoft
- Type: Classified Advertising
- Website: Archived official website at the Wayback Machine (archive index)

Windows Live Expo (codenamed Fremont) was described by Microsoft as an "online social marketplace". The website ceased operations on July 31, 2008.

The site was similar to Craigslist in that it provided online classifieds. A major focus of the site was that users could choose whose listings they want to search, sorted either by friends and contacts or by geographical proximity.

Expo integrated with several other Windows Live services. Results could be mapped using Live Search Maps, users could contact the poster of a listing via Windows Live Messenger and promote their own listing on Windows Live Spaces.
