= Windows Live for TV =

Discontinued application to connect to Windows Live

- The Windows Live TV logo.
- Screenshot of Windows Live for TV
- Developer: Microsoft
- Operating system: Windows Vista Home Premium or Ultimate
- Type: Windows Media Center application, Social Networking
- Website: Archived official website at the Wayback Machine (archive index)

Windows Live for TV (codenamed Orbit, previously Nemo) is a discontinued Windows Media Center application that was part of Microsoft's Windows Live services. It provided users to access Windows Live Spaces, Messenger, and Call on their large-screen monitors or TVs using their PC.

The goal of Windows Live for TV before its discontinuation was to integrate the services of Windows Live into a 10-foot interface for use on televisions as a Windows Media Center application, bringing social networking and instant messaging to a new form factor that would've been both intuitive and fun to use. The application is built using Windows Presentation Foundation (.NET Framework 3.0) and runs within Windows Media Center or directly in Windows Vista's Internet Explorer 7.0 browser.

The design of the user interface is glossy on its top and bottom panels, displaying a search box on the top panel, and buttons to change status and to sign out on the bottom. The design and background is based on Windows Live's Wave 1 design language with its bright lines of energy creating depth. Users would scroll through the content on a 3D carousel, and scrolling vertically also goes through the different types of content from Windows Live like Spaces or Messenger information.

Planned features of Windows Live for TV included:

- Browse Windows Live Spaces in 3D graphics with new "Gallery" views and full keyword search
- Real-time text and voice conversations with Windows Live Messenger
- Call your friends' mobile or landline telephones with Windows Live Call to make affordable domestic and international calls
- Make free PC-to-PC calls to other Windows Live Messenger users
- Easily navigate with a mouse, keyboard or a TV remote (remote navigation requires Windows Media Center Remote and Infrared Adapter)

Although beta versions of this service have been released, only Spaces functionality was available. A Program Manager has stated that development has ceased, and the service was shut down on June 24, 2008. The Windows Live for TV team blog has not been updated for a year, while the WPF/XBAP technology used in Windows Live for TV was deprecated by Microsoft in Windows Media Center SDK 5.3.

== Requirements ==
Windows Live for TV - Phone Call feature

Windows Live for TV requires the following system requirements prior to installation:

- Windows Vista Home Premium (x86) or Ultimate Edition (x86)
- DirectX 9 GPU (with WDDM and Pixel Shader 2.0 support)
- Windows Media Center remote and Infrared adapter
- 1GB of RAM
- A speaker and headphone for PC-to-PC phone and video calling
- A Webcam for PC-to-PC video calling

== See also ==
- Windows Live
- Windows Live Spaces
- Windows Live Messenger
