= Microsoft Start =

News app from Microsoft

- Developer: Microsoft
- Initial release: October 26, 2012; 13 years ago
- Platform: Android, iOS, Web platform
- Type: Online news
- Website: www.msn.com/feed

Microsoft Start was a web portal that featured news headlines and articles that MSN editors chose. The app included sections for top stories, regional events, international events, politics, money, technology, entertainment, opinion, sports, and crime, along with other miscellaneous stories. The app was available for Android and iOS devices only; other users used its web version.

Microsoft Start was the planned successor to Microsoft News and MSN, which are also available for Windows. With the release of Windows 11, however, Microsoft directly integrated news into Windows taskbar, and was later backported to Windows 10.

Microsoft sends unsolicited "Start Daily" news bulletins to its Outlook mail customers unless they block or unsubscribe from the service.

From November 2024, the Microsoft Start website and app were rebranded back to the MSN brand, ending Microsoft's attempts of rebranding MSN.

== Predecessor ==
Microsoft News (formerly MSN News and Bing News) is the predecessor of Microsoft Start. It has been included with Windows Phone, Windows 8, Windows 8.1, and Windows 10. It is still available on the Microsoft Store. It allows users to set their own favorite topics and sources, receive notifications of breaking news though alerts, filter preferred news sources, and alter font sizes to make articles easier to read. Originally, News included an RSS feed, but that capability was removed; Microsoft currently only allows users to subscribe to specified news sources. News uses the live tile feature introduced in the Windows 10 Anniversary Update. If a user clicks on the News Start menu tile when a particular story is shown, the user will see a link to that story at the top of the app when it launches.
