= Live Connect =

Windows Live Developer Center, which contains libraries, code samples, documentations, downloads, and forums for Live Connect

Live Connect (previously Messenger Connect, Live Services and Windows Live Dev) is a collection of APIs and common controls that allow developers to have a deeper control and offers access to the core Windows Live services and data through open and easily accessible application programming interfaces (APIs). At MIX07, Microsoft's Senior Architect Danny Thorpe described:

[The Windows Live Platform] today can combine video, photos, contacts, maps, and search into web applications. Users can drop web controls into the web applications with just a few lines of JavaScript and be up and running in a matter of minutes, and they can dive a little deeper to access service APIs directly and define their own UI and process flow. Users have control over what applications can access their private data, and can revoke that access at any time.

Live Connect is built on standard web technologies such as OAuth 2.0, Representational State Transfer (REST), and JavaScript Object Notation (JSON), and is designed to work with any technology or device including ASP.NET, Microsoft Silverlight (in-browser and out-of-browser models), Windows Presentation Foundation (WPF), Adobe Flash, PHP, and Java.

Live Connect was released on June 24, 2010 as part of Windows Live's "Wave 4" release (known then as Messenger Connect), and unites previously separate APIs of Windows Live (Windows Live ID, Windows Live Contacts, Windows Live Messenger Web Toolkit, and others) into a single API that is based on industry standards and specifications. On September 13, 2011, Messenger Connect was renamed to Live Connect and brings additional APIs for OneDrive and Outlook contacts and calendars as well as adding XMPP support for the Messenger service.

== Libraries, interfaces, and controls ==
Live Connect provides a variety of ways for developers to integrate their applications. Live Connect can be used on websites, in desktop applications, as well as Windows 8 Metro-style apps. Developers may select from several different types of integration, each covering a variety of scenarios, including:

- OAuth 2.0
- Representational state transfer (REST)
- JavaScript Object Notation (JSON)

Live Connect include the following capabilities for websites, applications, and devices:

Service	Implementation	Description
OneDrive	Photos	Allow users upload, view, share or print photos stored on their SkyDrive from within the developer's website, application, or device.
OneDrive	Documents	Allow users open, save, access, and share documents stored on their SkyDrive from within the developer's website, application, or device.
Outlook	Calendar	Allow developers to access and save calendar appointments to the user's Hotmail Calendar and provide developers the ability to remind their users important events based on their existing Calendar events.
Outlook	Contacts	Allow developers to access their user's Hotmail Contacts list, and allow these users to identify which of their contacts are already members of the developer's website or application.
Messenger	XMPP Interface	Provides APIs for developers to integrate the Windows Live Messenger instant messaging service on their website, application, or device via the XMPP protocol.
Messenger	Status Update	Allow developers to update a user's status on Windows Live Messenger to let their friends know that they are currently using your website or application.
Messenger	Sharing Badge	Allow developers to integrate a "sharing badge" on their website, allowing users to share the content on the developer's website or application via Windows Live Messenger.
ID	Authentication	A single sign-on solution which allow users to identify themselves by using their Windows Live ID to authentication through to the developer's website or application.
ID	Profile	Allow developer's website or application to access their user's Profile data such as name, birthday, work profile, and contact details.

== Windows Live Client Extensibility APIs ==
In addition, Microsoft also offers Windows Live Client Extensibility APIs for Windows Live Client software such as Windows Live Photo Gallery, Writer, and Messenger. These APIs are separate from Live Connect, and includes the following capabilities:

Service	Description
Messenger Activity SDK	Allows developers to build applications and games that take advantage of the multiuser communication functionality provided by Windows Live Messenger. These applications and games can be accessed via the "Activities" or "Games" menu within a Windows Live Messenger Conversation window.
Photo Gallery SDK	Includes the Publishing Plug-in Platform which enables the creation of photo and video publishing plug-ins for Windows Live Photo Gallery, as well as Simple Extensibility Points which provide ways to extend, customize, and integrate with Windows Live Photo Gallery.
Writer SDK	Includes the Application API that allow developers create applications that launches Windows Live Writer to create new posts or "Blog This" items for links, snippets, images, and feed items, the Content Source Plugin API that help developers to extend the capabilities of Windows Live Writer to insert, edit, and publish new types of content, and the Provider Customization API that allow developers to customize and add new capabilities to the Windows Live Writer user interface.

== See also ==
- Windows Live
