= Windows Live Barcode =

- The Windows Live Barcode logo.

- Windows Live Barcode homepage
- Developer: Microsoft
- Operating system: Windows Mobile
- Type: Barcode scanning, Contact card management
- License: Proprietary
- Website: Archived official website at the Wayback Machine (archive index)

Prototype screenshot of Windows Live Barcode on Windows Mobile

Windows Live Barcode (codenamed Confucius) was a part of Microsoft's Windows Live services. It allowed users to transfer information between various media (PCs, billboards, magazines etc.) and handsets via Quick Response Code (QR Code), a two-dimensional matrix barcode. It provided a method for people to exchange information and use various online services on handsets.

Windows Live Barcode aimed to enhance mobile handset utility and provide users with more convenience and flexibility. It was to be integrated with the Windows Mobile platform.

The Windows Live Barcode service consists of two elements:

- Online tools to generate barcodes for business contact cards or personal messages (450 character limit)
- A mobile scanning application to read QR codes into a Windows Mobile handset

Barcodes generated are saved as PNG images.

== Features ==
- Encode text information such as news, notes and URLs into a QR Code and transfer onto a mobile handset
- Transfer information from traditional business card to a mobile handset by taking a snapshot via the Windows Live Barcode application
- Save the digital business card on the mobile handset's address book and allow the ability to manage contacts digitally
- Search and edit specific contact business cards scanned via Windows Live Barcode application

== Windows Live Confucius ==
Windows Live Barcode was shortly taken offline following its beta launch in October 2006. In August 2007, an offshoot of Windows Live Barcode named Windows Live Confucius was launched. Windows Live Confucius, similar to Windows Live Barcode, allowed users to create QR Codes online from a web browser. In addition, Windows Live Confucius also allowed users to create QR Codes using an offline Windows application from their desktop, named Desktop QR Code generator. Together with the launch of Desktop QR Code generator, the QR Reader client was released as well for users to view QR codes on their Windows Mobile devices.

The Desktop QR Code generator can generate QR Code for any text, vCard, calendar and URL information. The QR Reader client, although designed for Windows Mobile devices, has only been tested on the Dopod and not any other Windows Mobile devices.

== Successor ==
Microsoft Tag serves as successor to the concept of Windows Live Barcode.

== See also ==
- Windows Live
- Windows Live Mobile
- Semacode
