= Microsoft Points =

Digital currency issued by Microsoft

Unit
- Plural: Points, Microsoft Points, MSP

Denominations
- Banknotes
- Freq. used: Cards of 200, 400, 700, 800, 1200, 1400, 1500, 1600, 2000, 2100, 2800, 3000, 3500, 4000, 4200, 4500, 6000

Issuance
- Central bank: Microsoft

Microsoft Points, introduced in November 2005 as Xbox Live Points, were a digital currency issued by Microsoft for use on its Xbox and Zune product lines. Points could be used to purchase video games and downloadable content from Xbox Live Marketplace, digital content such as music and videos on Zune Marketplace, along with content from Windows Live Gallery.

In June 2013, Microsoft announced that it would phase out Microsoft Points by the end of 2013, in favor of using local cash currencies (such as the United States dollar and Euro) on its digital distribution platforms. An Xbox 360 software update implementing this change was released on August 26, 2013; users' existing Microsoft Points were converted into an equivalent amount of local currency for purchases.

== Distribution ==
Microsoft Points were sold online and through gift cards at retail outlets. In North America, points could only be purchased in 400 point increments. In the United States, the minimum 400 points cost $5 to purchase, 800 cost $10, while 1600 cost $20.

== Criticism ==
The Microsoft Points system was criticized for being deceptive in terms of actual real-world cost, as well as for users often having to purchase more points at once than those they immediately needed. In his review of the Zune, Paul Thurrott argued that "a song on Zune typically costs 79 Microsoft Points, which, yes, is about 99 cents. But it seems to be less because it's just 79 Points." Walter Mossberg also noted that "to buy even a single 99 cent song from the Zune store, you have to purchase blocks of "points" from Microsoft, in increments of at least $5. You can't just click and have the 99 cents deducted from a credit card, as you can with iTunes. So, even if you are buying only one song, you have to allow Microsoft to hold on to at least $4.01 of your money until you buy another."

Xbox product director Aaron Greenberg defended the Points system, arguing that the system was intended to reduce the number of individual credit card transaction fees Microsoft would have to manage for its users.

== Discontinuation ==
The Xbox services launched alongside Windows 8—Xbox Music and Xbox Video (now known as Groove Music and Microsoft Movies & TV respectively) defaulted to using credit card transactions with local currency for purchases instead of Microsoft Points. However, when accessed from an Xbox 360 console, users were still required to pay using Microsoft Points. In May 2013, reports indicated that Microsoft Points would be discontinued entirely in favor of unified gift cards with currency that would work across Xbox, Windows Store, and Windows Phone Store.

Microsoft's plans to discontinue Points were confirmed during its E3 2013 media event focusing on the Xbox One, and took effect with the roll-out of an Xbox 360 software update on August 26, 2013. Users' existing Microsoft Points were converted into a currency amount "equal to or greater [than]" their current Points balance. Currency gained from converted Points expired on June 1, 2015.

Subsequently, and by September 2013, Microsoft Rewards Points were re-introduced through the Xbox Rewards program (now named Microsoft Rewards).

== See also ==
- Microsoft Rewards
- PlayStation Store
- Nintendo Points
