= Microsoft family features =

Features in Windows 10

- Microsoft Family Safety Logo
- Other names: Microsoft Family Safety (Windows 8 & Windows 8.1); Parental Controls (Windows 7 & Windows Vista)
- Operating system: Microsoft Windows, as Family Safety on Android, iOS
- Type: Parental controls
- Website: https://account.microsoft.com/family/

Microsoft family features (includes family safety features formerly known as Microsoft Family Safety, formerly Parental Controls in Windows 7 and Vista) is a free set of features available on Windows 10 PC and Mobile that is bundled with the Windows 10, Home edition operating system. On July 17, 2020, Microsoft released Microsoft Family Safety on Google Play and App Store (iOS) as well. Starting in Windows 10, a Microsoft Account is required to use the Microsoft family features. A parent can manage settings for a child if both of their Microsoft Accounts are in the same family. When parents turn on settings for their child, these settings are applied to every device that the child logs into with that Microsoft Account.

Other changes to family safety features in Windows 10 include Windows Store purchase controls and the ability to find a child's Windows 10 Mobile device on a map.

== History ==
Microsoft has offered family safety features since March 2006 when a preview of Windows Live OneCare Family Safety was first offered to 3000 beta testers. After over a year and a half of testing, the final version was released on November 6, 2007. On December 15, 2008, Microsoft released an updated version 2009 of the software, and rebranded it as Windows Live Family Safety, removing it from the discontinued Windows Live OneCare family of products. Web Filtering and Activity Reporting were previously features in Windows Vista Parental Controls. They were removed from the Windows 7 release when they were moved to Windows Live. On September 30, 2010, Windows Live Family Safety 2011 (Wave 4) was released as part of Windows Live Essentials 2011.

On May 14, 2012, Microsoft announced that Windows Live Family Safety will be renamed to Microsoft Family Safety and will be built-in as part of its Windows 8 operating system.

In August 2015, Microsoft Family Safety was renamed Microsoft Family Features and the family features offering was expanded beyond that of just family safety to include Windows Store funding.

On December 16, 2015, Microsoft added new features to Windows 10 which included screen time extensions and the ability to manage settings for both Windows 10 PC and Mobile in one place.

In addition, Microsoft added a unified management center for recent activity, browsing history, app and game purchasing and downloading history and made it possible for a parent account to locate their child's Windows 10 phone.

== Windows 8 features ==
- Web Filtering – Family Safety has a Windows Filtering Platform driver to filter web browsing. The service filters in 18 different languages and contains the following levels:
  - Allow List Only – Only allows websites that a parent has added to the Allow list.
  - Warn on adult content – Allows all websites but warns when the site contains suspected adult material. This setting was designed for older children who are trusted to make good decisions when the web filter incorrectly categorizes a site.
- Activity Reporting – Parents can obtain a list of the websites visited. They can also obtain a list of the following: computer usage time, programs run, files downloaded, and games run, which will be reported via Windows Parental Controls.
- Enforce the adult filter of Google Search, Bing, Yahoo!, and other popular search engines. For Google, this means locking SafeSearch.
- Control of Family Safety settings to set time limits, and game restrictions ala ESRB as well as general application restrictions.
- Control of which programs a user is allowed to run.
- Family Safety allows remote access to its features via the web interface. Windows Live Family Safety 2011 added support for using the web filtering/blocking controls without the child having a Windows Live ID.
- Family Safety blocks InPrivate browsing in Internet Explorer 8 and 9.
- Image Filtering – When Family Safety's SafeSearch is enabled, this filter looks for adult content in images. The filter is only run on websites which do not do an adequate job of filtering the images and only on computers with sufficient performance capabilities. When an image is blocked, Family Safety blurs it out.
- Family Safety for Windows 8 Mobile will be discontinued in the following months.

== Windows 10 features ==
- Partial Web Filtering – Web filtering is restricted to Microsoft Edge and Microsoft Internet Explorer browsers (excluding Windows 10 Mobile). Turning on web filtering for a child blocks access to adult websites and enables safe search, which filters out adult content in search results from Bing, Google, Yahoo! and other popular search engines. When Web Filtering is enabled, the safe search setting blurs out adult content in images. The web filter provides blacklisting and whitelisting of websites by a parent account. Web Filtering blocks InPrivate browsing in Microsoft Internet Explorer and Microsoft Edge. When the child is blocked from visiting a website, they can send a request to the parent asking for permission. Upon approval the child can visit the website. Most other commonly used browsers are automatically blocked, but can be enabled if required.
- Activity Reporting – Parents can obtain a list of the websites visited, device usage time, and apps used for any Windows 10 PC or Mobile devices.
- Screen time – Parents can restrict the amount of time a child can use the PC, and specify the time intervals that PCs can be used as well as a maximum time allowance per PC. A parent can approve extensions when time runs out.
- App, games & media limits (Store only) – In Windows 10 it is no longer possible to block non-Windows Store applications. Only Windows Store apps can be restricted. Parents can set an age rating for content that a child can acquire in the Windows Store. This applies to apps, games, music, and movie content that a child can browse or acquire in the Windows Store. Parents can explicitly block Store apps or games but only after they have been used by the child.
- Purchase & spending features – Parents can add money to their child's account that the child can then use to buy content in the Windows Store. This feature allows parents to give their children spending allowances without having to attach a credit card to the child's account. Parents can see a child's recent purchases in the Windows Store.
- Find your child – Parents can find their child's Windows 10 Mobile phone on a map.
