= Windows Live OneCare =

Discontinued Microsoft security software

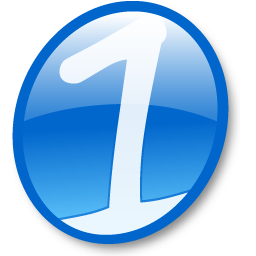

- A screenshot of Windows Live OneCare 2.5.2900.30
- Developer: Microsoft
- Final release: 2.5.2900.30 / 6 March 2010
- Operating system: Windows XP, Windows Vista
- Platform: IA-32 and x86-64
- Type: Anti-virus software; Backup software; Personal firewall
- License: Trialware
- Website: Archived official website at the Wayback Machine (archive index)

Windows Live OneCare (previously Windows OneCare Live, codenamed A1) was a computer security and performance enhancement service developed by Microsoft for Windows. An initial core technology of OneCare was the multi-platform RAV (Reliable Anti-virus), which Microsoft purchased from GeCAD Software Srl in 2003, but subsequently discontinued and replaced before launch. The software was available as an annual paid subscription, which could be used on up to three computers.

On 18 November 2008, Microsoft announced that Windows Live OneCare would be discontinued on 30 June 2009 and will instead be offering users a new free anti-malware suite called Microsoft Security Essentials to be available before then. However, virus definitions and support for OneCare would continue until a subscription expires. In the end-of-life announcement, Microsoft noted that Windows Live OneCare would not be upgraded to work with Windows 7 and would also not work in Windows XP Mode.

== History ==
Windows Live OneCare entered a beta state in the summer of 2005. The managed beta program was launched before the public beta, and was located on BetaPlace, Microsoft's former beta delivery system. On 31 May 2006, Windows Live OneCare made its official debut in retail stores in the United States.

The beta version of Windows Live OneCare 1.5 was released in early October 2006 by Microsoft. Version 1.5 was released to manufacturing on 3 January 2007 and was made available to the public on 30 January 2007. On 4 July 2007, beta testing started for version 2.0, and the final version was released on 16 November 2007.

Microsoft acquired Komoku on 20 March 2008 and merged its computer security software into Windows Live OneCare.

Windows Live OneCare 2.5 (build 2.5.2900.28) final was released on 3 July 2008. On the same day, Microsoft also released Windows Live OneCare for Server 2.5.

== Features ==
Windows Live OneCare featured integrated anti-virus, personal firewall, and backup utilities, and a tune-up utility with the integrated functionality of Windows Defender for malware protection. A future addition of a registry cleaner was considered but not added because "there are not significant customer advantages to this functionality". Version 2 added features such as multi-PC and home network management, printer sharing support, start-time optimizer, proactive fixes and recommendations, monthly reports, centralized backup, and online photo backup.

Windows Live OneCare was built for ease-of-use and was designed for home users. OneCare also attempted a very minimal interface to lessen user confusion and resource use. It added an icon to the notification area that told the user at a glance the status of the system's health by using three alert colors: green (good), yellow (fair), and red (at risk).

=== Compatibility ===
Version 1.5 of OneCare is only compatible with the 32 bit versions of Windows XP and Windows Vista. Version 2 of OneCare supports 64 bit compatibility to Vista. In version 2.5, Microsoft released Windows Live OneCare for Server which supports Windows Server 2008 Standard 64-bit and Windows Small Business Server 2008 Standard and Premium editions. No edition of OneCare operates in safe mode. Windows Live OneCare does not support Windows 7 or later as its development was discontinued and was replaced by Microsoft Security Essentials.

=== Activation ===
Windows Live OneCare required users to activate the product if they wish to continue using it after the free trial period (90 days) through a valid Windows Live ID. When the product is activated, the grey message bar at the top of the program disappears. The subscription remains active for 1 year from the date of activation. Windows Live OneCare did not require the operating system to be checked with Windows Genuine Advantage.

=== Protection ===
Windows Live OneCare Protection Plus was the security component in the OneCare suite. It consisted of three parts:

- A personal firewall capable of monitoring and blocking both incoming and outgoing traffic (The built-in Windows Firewall in Windows XP only monitors and blocks incoming traffic)
- An anti-virus tool that used regularly updated anti-virus definition files to protect against malicious software
- An anti-spyware tool that used the Windows Defender engine as a core to protect against potentially unwanted software (In version 1.0, this required the separate installation of Windows Defender and was not integrated into the OneCare interface, although it could be managed and launched from OneCare. Version 1.5 integrated the Windows Defender engine into OneCare and no longer required separate installation.)

Windows Live OneCare 1.5 onwards also monitored Internet Explorer 7 and 8 security settings and ensured that the automatic website checking feature of the Phishing Filter was enabled.

=== Performance ===

Windows Live OneCare Performance Plus was the component that performed monthly PC tune-up related tasks, such as:

- Disk cleanup and defragmentation.
- A full virus scan using the anti-virus component in the suite.
- User notification if files are in need of backing up.
- Check for Windows updates by using the Microsoft Update service.

=== Backup ===
Windows Live OneCare Backup and Restore was the component that aided in backing up important files. Files could be backed up to various recordable media, such as external hard disks, CDs, and DVDs. When restoring files, the entirety or a subset of them could also be restored to a networked computer, as long as it's running OneCare as well. The Backup and Restore component supported backup software features such as incremental backups and scheduling.

== Criticism ==
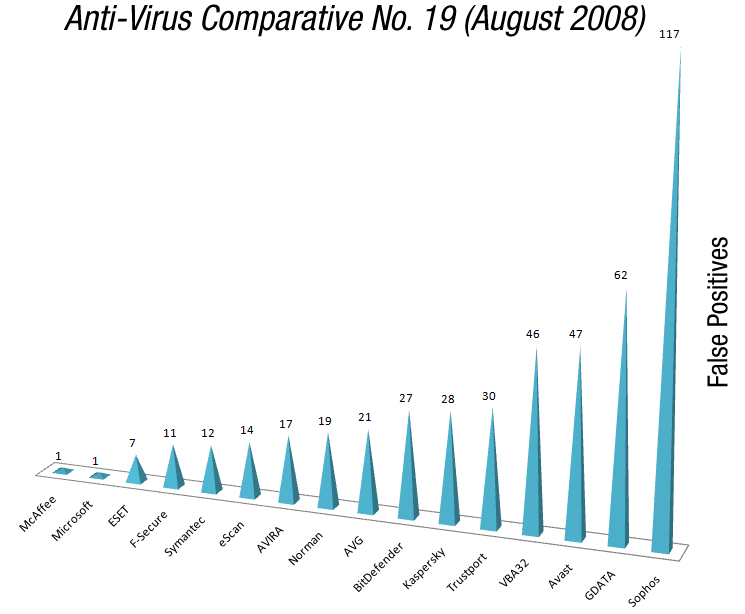
Windows Live OneCare tied for the fewest false positives

Windows Live OneCare has been criticized from both users and competing security software companies.

Microsoft's acquisition of GeCAD RAV, a core technology of OneCare, and their subsequent discontinuation of that product, deprived the Linux platform (and others) of one of its leading virus scanning tools for e-mail servers, bringing Microsoft's ultimate intentions into question.

On 26 January 2006, Windows Live OneCare was criticized by Foundstone (a division of the competing McAfee anti-virus) for the integrated firewall having default white lists which allow Java applications and digitally signed software to bypass user warnings, since neither of those applications carry assurances that they will not have security flaws or be written with a malicious intent. Microsoft has since responded to the criticism, justifying their decision in that Java applications are "widely used by third party applications, and is a popular and trusted program among our users", and that "it is highly unusual for malware to be signed."

Windows Live OneCare has also been criticized for the lack of adherence to industry firewall standards concerning intrusion detection. Tests conducted by Agnitum (the developers of Outpost Firewall) have shown OneCare failing to detect trojans and malware which hijack applications already resident on an infected machine.

In February 2007, the first Windows Vista anti-virus product testing by Virus Bulletin magazine (a sister company of Sophos, the developers of Sophos Anti-Virus) found that Windows Live OneCare failed to detect 18.6% of viruses. Fifteen anti-virus products were tested. To pass the Virus Bulletin's VB100 test, an anti-virus product has to detect 100% of the viruses.

AV-Comparatives also released results that placed Windows Live OneCare last in its testing of seventeen anti-virus products. In response, Jimmy Kuo of the Microsoft Security Research and Response (MSRR) team pledged to add "truly important" ("actively being spread") malware as soon as possible, while "[test detection] numbers will get better and better" for other malware "until they are on par with the other majors in this arena." He also expressed confidence in these improvements: "Soon after, [other majors] will need to catch up to us!"

As of April 2008, Windows Live OneCare has passed the VB100 test under Windows Vista SP1 Business Edition. As of August 2008, Windows Live OneCare placed 14th out of 16 anti-virus products in on-demand virus detection rates. On the other hand, as of May 2009, Windows Live OneCare placed 2nd in a proactive/retrospective performance test conducted by AV-Comparatives. AV-Comparatives.org, the test issuer, denotes that it had "very few false alarms, which is a very good achievement." The publisher also points out that false positives can cause as much harm as genuine infections, and furthermore, anti-virus scanners prone to false alarms essentially achieve higher detection scores.

== Community Revival ==
After Windows Live OneCare was discontinued, end-users of the product could no longer install Windows Live OneCare due to the installer checking Microsoft OneCare's site for updates. This resulted in the installation giving an error message 'Network problems are preventing Windows Live OneCare Installation from continuing at this time'.

A user named 'Cobs Server Closet' successfully recreated a functioning version of the installer, allowing end-users owning existing installation media to reinstall the software. This project is named 'OneCare Rewritten'. While the OneCare Rewritten software did allow successful installation of OneCare, many of the notable features such as OneCare Circles and built-in Backup feature remain non-functional as a result of being dependent on Microsoft Windows Live OneCare servers.

== See also ==
- Windows Defender
- Windows Live
