= MSN WiFi Hotspots =

Discontinued WiFi hotspot locator

- The MSN WiFi Hotspots logo.

- MSN WiFi Hotspots
- Developer(s): Microsoft
- Type: WiFi Locator

Windows Live WiFi Center
- The Windows Live WiFi Center logo.

- Windows Live WiFi Center (Beta 4)
- Developer(s): Microsoft
- Preview release: Beta 4
- Type: WiFi Locator
- Website: Archived official website at the Wayback Machine (archive index)

MSN WiFi Hotspots, previously Windows Live WiFi Hotspot Locator, was a website that helped users to locate wireless Internet hotspots worldwide and view their positions on a map using Live Search Maps.

This service has been discontinued as of June 10, 2008.

== Windows Live WiFi Center ==
Windows Live WiFi Center was part of Microsoft's Windows Live services that helped users to find and connect to wireless networks around the world. It allowed users to search for wireless networks that are available and displayed information about them such as security configuration and signal strength. In addition, users could also add wireless networks as favorites, track connection history, and manage network preferences. It used VPN technology to secure a wireless Internet connection on unsecured networks.

The service allowed users to search for free and fee-based wireless networks, showing information such as address, description, available amenities, service providers and location using Live Search Maps.

Windows Live Wifi Center was discontinued after the rebranding of Windows Live WiFi Hotspot Locator to MSN WiFi Hotspots.

=== Requirements ===
Windows Live WiFi Center requires the following software to be installed prior to installation:

- Microsoft .NET Framework 2.0
- Microsoft Core XML Services (MSXML) 6.0
- Wi-Fi Protected Access 2 (WPA2)
