= Hotfix =

Software update released outside the normal update cycle

A hotfix is a software update that is released outside the normal update cycle or intended to be applied to a live system, often to fix a bug.

Originally, hotfix referred to patching a hot system – a production server that is actively serving clients. For development, such a change usually must be designed quickly and outside normal development processes, at relatively high cost and at the expense of other development effort. For the user, a hotfix is relatively risky since it is applied to a server without time for testing it. The risk of applying the hotfix must be weighed against the risk of not applying it. The problem to be fixed might be so critical that inaction is riskier than the potential loss of service.

Over time, the meaning has shifted to an update that is created with urgency or released outside the normal update cycle for the software.

Applying (installing) a hotfix generally involves the same process as any software update. Most modern operating systems and desktop applications can download and apply updates automatically. Network administrators may use software programs to automate and simplify applying updates to the machines they manage.

== Use by Microsoft ==
Microsoft Corporation used the terms hotfix or quick-fix engineering update (QFE) but has stopped in favor of new terminology. Updates are either delivered in the general distribution release (GDR) channel or the limited distribution release (LDR) channel – the latter synonymous with QFE. GDR updates receive extensive testing whereas LDR updates are meant to fix a certain problem in a small area and are not released to the general public. GDR updates may be received from the Windows Update service or the Microsoft Download Center but LDR updates must be received via Microsoft Support.

== See also ==
- Patch (computing) – Data and process for mutating a software resource to a desired state
- Service pack – Single installable package of software updates
