= Bing Shopping =

Microsoft product search website

- Logo of Bing Shopping
- Developer(s): Microsoft
- Type: Search engine
- Website: http://www.bing.com/shop

Bing Shopping (formerly MSN Shopping, Windows Live Shopping, Live Search Products and Windows Live Product Search) is a products search and discovery service that allows users to search for products from various sellers together on a single website. It uses Bing to show product results–including photos and product details. Products can be filtered and prices compared. Purchases are completed on the seller's website.

Discontinued around October 1, 2013,^{[1]} it was relaunched in August 2017 using a paid model where merchants pay to list their products on the service using Bing Ads Product Ads.

== History ==
A screenshot of Windows Live Shopping homepage

Windows Live Shopping was originally launched in Beta form as part of Microsoft's Windows Live suite. It was built entirely on AJAX technology and had many social and community features. In addition to a retail shopping website, it featured drag-and-drop items to a shopping list, share lists with other users, product and seller reviews, public shopping guides with Windows Live Shopping Guides and an enhanced preview.

On February 20, 2007, Windows Live Shopping beta was rebranded as MSN Shopping. Part of the reason for this decision was to reduce the number of shopping services Microsoft offered, which included MSN Shopping, Windows Live Expo and Live Product Search. Microsoft's spokesperson stated that the beta testing was intended to obtain an insight into user behavior and the data would be incorporated into plans for future products. It was stated that user-created content from Windows Live Shopping beta (lists, guides, and reviews) would continue to be available on MSN Shopping. Windows Live Shopping Guides was discontinued as part of the rebranding.

As MSN Shopping, the service aggregated millions of product offers from thousands of retailers, allowing users to search or browse for products. Searches could be sorted by relevance, popularity or by price (either ascending or descending). Refinements were available to allow the user to narrow the results set.

On August 23, 2013, Bing announced that it would replace Bing Shopping with Product Search which integrates product results within Bing search results instead of linking to a separate webpage.

== Cashback program ==
A screenshot of Bing Cashback homepage

Bing Cashback was a loyalty program which allowed users to search for products and receive money back for purchases made through the site. It was originally started in June 2006 by Jellyfish.com. On October 2, 2007, Microsoft announced it was purchasing Jellyfish.com for an estimated price of $50 million, with the intent of using the Jellyfish engine as part of their Live Search services in attempt to catch up to Google in the search market.

The cashback service was officially announced as Live Search Cashback on May 22, 2008. From December 1, 2008, it began offering users to receive cashbacks instantly, instead of having to wait for 60 days. This feature only worked in conjunction with eBay.

Microsoft officially merged Cashback with the rest of the Live Search products on April 14, 2009, later renaming it to Bing Cashback on June 3, 2009, as part of its rebranding of Live Search to Bing. On June 4, 2010, Microsoft announced that Bing Cashback would be retired on July 30, 2010, due to lack of interest.

== See also ==
- Cashback website
