= Windows Live Alerts =

Discontinued alert service from Microsoft

- The Windows Live Alerts logo.

- Windows Live Alerts showing list of subscribed alert providers.
- Developer(s): Microsoft
- Website: Archived official website at the Wayback Machine (archive index)

Windows Live Alerts (formerly MSN Alerts) was a part of the Windows Live services from Microsoft that allowed users to get notification of time-sensitive events and information from various alert content providers. Users were able to choose how and when to receive alerts, so that users may stay informed no matter where they are.

Windows Live Alerts was a free service for users with a Windows Live ID (now Microsoft account). However, some content providers or wireless service providers may charge for using their content or service with Windows Live Alerts. Alerts to wireless devices are available to users in the United States, Canada and China only.

Windows Live Alerts was discontinued from September 30, 2010.

== Features ==
Windows Live Alerts offered the following main features for users to manage their alerts:

- Set or change time zone
- Specify where Windows Live Alerts are sent
- Receive alerts with Windows Live Messenger
- Receive alerts on a mobile device
- View a list of recently received alerts
- Set quiet times when no alerts will be sent
- Unsubscribe or turn off alerts

== Integration ==
Windows Live Alerts integrates tightly with Windows Live Messenger, Windows Live Hotmail (now Outlook.com) and Windows Live Mobile. An "Alerts" tab is available in Windows Live Messenger showing a list of recent alerts organized by date or provider's name. When a new alert arrives, a "toast" will appear in the user's screen showing the alert's headline. If the user is signed out of Messenger, the user can choose to have the alerts sent to their e-mail or mobile devices.

== Syndication Edition ==
Windows Live Alerts Syndication Edition allowed bloggers and other content providers to keep their readers up-to-date and drive traffic to their websites by providing alert services to their blogs and websites. Content providers were only required to publish their contents via RSS or Atom feeds and place a "Windows Live Alerts Sign-Up" link on their websites to utilize this service. Users could then subscribe to these alerts by clicking on the sign-up link. New contents' headlines would be automatically distributed via an alert to readers through Windows Live Messenger, Hotmail (now Outlook.com) or a mobile device, depending on the reader's alert settings.

Readers could modify their subscription settings or opt out of alert subscriptions by the content providers at any time.

Content providers could choose to have three different types of "toast" notifications displayed on their reader's screen when new alerts arrive:

- Classic Alert - an instant-messaging based alert with a small logo of the content provider
- Branded Alert - an instant-messaging based alert to which branding is applied
- Alert with Advertisement - an instant-messaging based alert where an applicable advertisement is associated with the notification

Currently, the "Branded Alert" option is only available to limited chosen content providers and under testing, while the new "Alert with Advertisement" option is only available for MSN Weather alerts.

== See also ==
- Windows Live
- Windows Live Messenger
- Windows Live Hotmail
- Windows Live Hotmail Calendar
