= Windows Live Toolbar =

Web browser toolbar extension

- Windows Live Toolbar
- Developer: Microsoft
- Final release: 14.0.8064.0206 / 12 February 2009; 17 years ago
- Operating system: Windows Server 2008, Windows XP, Windows Vista, Windows 7
- Type: Browser extension (Toolbar)
- License: Freeware
- Website: Archived official website at the Wayback Machine (archive index)

Windows Live Toolbar is a toolbar browser extension for Internet Explorer, created by Microsoft. It superseded MSN Search Toolbar. Windows Live Toolbar provided a simple search interface that starts to list results as the user types in a search query and uses Bing as its search engine. The toolbar also allows users to synchronize their Internet Explorer favorites across multiple computers and provides an interface to Windows Live and MSN services.

Microsoft also added more tools to Windows Live Toolbar by acquiring Onfolio and integrating it into Windows Live Toolbar.

Founded by JJ Allaire, Allaire Corporation co-founder and creator of the programming language ColdFusion, along with Adam Berrey and Charles Teague, Onfolio was an online research tool that could be used to collect data from the web and make annotations such as inking and text highlighting. Onfolio could be used to download online pages for offline viewing, including document files such as Adobe PDF. It could also be used as an RSS reader. Users could share the information and feeds collected by Onfolio via email and blogs. After Microsoft acquired Onfolio, it integrated the product with Windows Live Toolbar, which was the only way to get Onfolio. As of August 2008 however, Microsoft announced that the Onfolio has been discontinued.

Older versions of Windows Live Toolbar also provided a form filler and a highlight viewer, but these features have been removed.

Windows Live Toolbar is included with Windows Live Essentials "Wave 3" release. However, it is no longer a part of the "Wave 4" version of Windows Live Essentials (released on 30 September 2010); it was succeeded by Bing Bar. According to Microsoft, Windows Live Toolbar was officially discontinued on 31 March 2011.

The IE Favorites syncing option was previously included initially as favorites.live.com and then in the Windows Live Toolbar, it is now part of the Windows Live Essentials suite, in the Windows Live Mesh solution.

== See also ==
- Bing Bar
- Google Toolbar
- Yahoo! Toolbar
