= OneDrive Groups =

Online service by Microsoft

- OneDrive Groups homepage
- Developer: Microsoft
- Type: Social groups
- Website: Archived official website at the Wayback Machine (archive index)

OneDrive Groups, formerly Windows Live Groups, was an online service by Microsoft as part of its Windows Live range of services that enabled users to create their social groups for sharing, discussion and coordination.

== Features ==
The service allowed users to form their own community groups, like the way Facebook Groups function, allowing members of the group to participate in group discussions. In addition, Windows Live Groups integrated with the following Windows Live services to provide collaboration and sharing features:

- Calendar provides a group calendar function which allows all members of the Group to add or keep track of calendar events for their Group
- OneDrive provides members of the Group 15GB of storage to upload and share their files and documents for others in the Group to download
- Photos allow members of the Group to upload and share their photos with each other
- Outlook.com provides users to send mass group e-mail messages to all members of a particular Group they are part of.
- Office Online provides users with access to the Office Web Apps, and it uses the group's OneDrive storage.
- Windows Live Family Safety blocks the use of Windows Live Groups for child managed accounts.

The owner of the group could choose a group theme, message and a picture. They could also delete the group, manage who joins the group etc.

== History ==
Windows Live Groups was released on December 2, 2008. MSN Groups, a similar offering from Microsoft, has been discontinued on/after February 21, 2009. However, contents from MSN Groups could not be migrated over to Windows Live Groups, due to the different focus between the two products. The Windows Live Groups service is optimized for small groups like clubs or families, whereas MSN Groups caters to a wide variety of group sizes and types, including large public groups. Windows Live Groups was updated to the "Wave 4" release on June 7, 2010.

Windows Live Groups was transitioned to become part of SkyDrive, renamed OneDrive in February 2014. The groups.live.com address redirected to a SkyDrive (Now OneDrive) URL.

In May 2014, Microsoft removed the ability to create any new OneDrive groups.

Microsoft announced in August 2015 that OneDrive Groups would be closed on October 16, 2015.

== See also ==
- Google Groups
- Windows Live
- Yahoo Groups
