= Windows Live =

Former brand name for Microsoft online services

- Screenshot of Windows Live Home, which served as a central location to access all Windows Live services
- Website type: Software plus services (Web applications)
- Owner: Microsoft
- Website: Archived official website at the Wayback Machine (archive index)
- Commercial: No
- Registration: Required
- Users: 330 million
- Launched: November 1, 2005; 21 years ago
- Current status: Closed
- Content license: Proprietary

Windows Live is a discontinued brand name for a set of web services and software products developed by Microsoft as part of its software-as-a-service platform. Chief components under the brand name included web services (all of which were exposed through corresponding web applications), several computer programs that interact with the services, and specialized web services for mobile devices.

According to Microsoft, Windows Live was "a way to extend the Windows user experience". As such, Windows Vista's welcome screen provides a link to download Windows Live Messenger or to subscribe to Windows Live OneCare. Also, Windows Mail, Windows Photo Gallery and Windows Movie Maker were not offered with Windows 7 and became an exclusive part of Windows Live. Microsoft announced that Windows 8 would have Windows Live apps included out-of-the-box, and would include built-in synchronization technologies powered by OneDrive (then SkyDrive). The Windows Live brand was phased out during August 2012, when Microsoft released Windows 8 to manufacturing. Active Windows Live services remained active but were gradually renamed. The "live.com" domain, however, continues to be used in the URLs for Outlook, OneDrive, and the Login and Signup pages.

== History ==
Windows Live was first announced on November 1, 2005. In its initial release, several Windows Live properties were rebranded and enhanced from Microsoft's MSN set of products and services. However, MSN still exists alongside Windows Live as a means of delivering content (as opposed to customized content and communications). In May 2012 Microsoft began renaming Windows Live services, partly in anticipation of Windows 8, which integrates many of the Windows Live products and services into the operating system.

== Services ==
=== Online services ===
The following services were once part of Windows Live but are still online. Outlook.com and OneDrive still use the "Live" branding in the URL even though the brand name is dropped.

The usage of the Live.com domain was later extended to consumer versions of Microsoft Teams, Microsoft To Do, Microsoft Lists, to distinguish them from the enterprise versions.

Previous Name	Description	Later rebranded to	Website
ID	Provides single sign-on service, allowing users to log into various Microsoft products and services with the same credentials. Users can manage their accounts and link multiple IDs together using this service.	Microsoft account	account.microsoft.com
Profile	Allow users to manage their profile information and displays information about the particular user, their recent activities, and their relationship with other Windows Live users.	Microsoft account	account.microsoft.com
Hotmail	Free webmail service using AJAX technology	Outlook.com	outlook.live.com
Calendar	Calendaring web app that allows users to organize appointments, schedule meetings, set reminders, and share their calendar events.	Outlook.com	outlook.live.com
People	An address book service, which allows users to keep track of and synchronize their contacts' information. Allow users to add contacts from other social networks including Facebook, Twitter, LinkedIn, Google, Flickr and soon Sina Weibo and Skype to their Microsoft account.	Outlook.com	outlook.live.com
SkyDrive	Password-protected file hosting service. Enables file sharing and content synchronization. Can preview images, Microsoft Office documents and ZIP files. Integrates tightly with Office Web Apps and Outlook.com to serve as an online storage for their needs.	Microsoft OneDrive	onedrive.live.com
—	Note-taking software designed for free-form information gathering and multi-user collaboration. It gathers users' notes, drawings, screen clippings, and audio commentaries, and notes can also be shared with other OneNote users over the Internet or a network.	Microsoft OneNote	onedrive.live.com
—	Business communication platform offering workspace chat and videoconferencing, file storage, and application integration.	Microsoft Teams	teams.live.com
—	Cloud-based task management application that allows users to manage their tasks from a smartphone, tablet and computer.	Microsoft To Do	to-do.live.com
—	Allows users to create, share, and track data inside lists.	Microsoft Lists	lists.live.com

=== Mobile services ===
==== Windows Phone ====
My Windows Phone was a free online companion service for Windows Phone mobile devices that provided users with a free mobile phone back-up solution by wirelessly synchronizing contacts, calendar appointments, photos, and OneNote notebooks with a password-protected online portal. Users could access and manage their information stored on their Windows Phone devices via the online portal using their Microsoft account, as well as access a set of features for remotely ringing, locking, mapping, and erasing their lost phones. This service integrated tightly with other Windows Live services including Hotmail.com People and Calendar, and SkyDrive.

==== IOS ====
Microsoft released a Windows Live Messenger application on the iOS App Store, which allowed users on mobile devices running iOS to communicate with their contacts via the Microsoft Messenger service. In addition to the instant messaging functionalities, the application also allowed users to view their Messenger social feed, view their friends' Profiles, and integrate with Hotmail and Photos.

==== Feature phone ====
Windows Live also provided customized services specifically created for feature phones. It was offered via three channels — through Client-based (for Windows Mobile and other supported mobile devices such as Nokia phones), Web-based (for WAP or GPRS-enabled mobile web browsers), or SMS-based services.

Mobile Service	Offered through			Exchange ActiveSync support?	Description
Mobile Service	Client	Web	SMS	Exchange ActiveSync support?	Description
Calendar Mobile		Yes	Yes	Yes	Web-based version of Calendar designed for mobile devices to view, schedule and manage calendar appointments and events. SMS service for users to query today and tomorrow's appointments in their calendar
People Mobile	Yes	Yes	Yes	Yes	Web-based version of People designed for mobile devices for access to contact information. Client-based version allows integration of the contact list with the mobile device's address book. Also allows users to query contact information via SMS.
Groups Mobile		Yes			Web-based version of Live Groups designed for mobile devices
Hotmail Mobile	Yes	Yes	Yes	Yes	Web- and client-based version of Hotmail that targets mobile devices, and allows new email alerts via SMS
Messenger Mobile	Yes	Yes	Yes		Web- and client-based version of Windows Live Messenger that is designed for mobile devices, and allows users to send instant messages via SMS
Profile Mobile		Yes			View and update user's own Windows Live Profile information using a mobile device
SkyDrive Mobile	Yes	Yes			Web-based version of SkyDrive designed for mobile devices for accessing documents stored on the cloud. Client-based version allows upload of photos directly from a mobile phone camera.

=== Search services ===
Microsoft Bing, a replacement of the search engine Live Search, was originally named Windows Live Search (and MSN Search before that) and was once part of the Windows Live family of services. Windows Live Search once occupied the homepage of Live.com, the domain for all Windows Live services. However, on March 21, 2007, Microsoft decided to separate its search developments from its Windows Live services family, forming part of the Live Search and Ad Platform. As part of this reorganization, the new search brand, Live Search, was consolidated with Microsoft adCenter, a part of Microsoft's Platform and Systems division. However, Microsoft recognised that there was a brand issue as the word "Live" continued to remain in the brand. As an effort to create a new identity for Microsoft's search services, on June 3, 2009, Live Search was officially rebranded as Bing.

=== Developer services ===
Live Connect is a collection of APIs and common controls that allow developers to have deeper control and offer access to the core Windows Live services and data through open and easily accessible application programming interfaces (APIs). Live Connect is built on standard web technologies such as OAuth 2.0, Representational State Transfer (REST), and JavaScript Object Notation (JSON), and is designed to work with any technology or device. Live Connect unites the previously separate APIs of Windows Live into a single API that is based on industry standards and specifications.

=== Discontinued services ===
Name	Description	Replaced By	Discontinued Date
Agents	Interactive chatterbots through Windows Live Messenger that allowed users to get more information about specific topics.	—N/a	30 June 2009
Alerts	Sent information updates to the user's email inbox, mobile device or Messenger.	—N/a	30 September 2010
Barcode	2D barcodes that can be used to store information or link to the mobile web.	Microsoft Tag	Never launched
Call	Allowed users to make PC-to-PC and PC-to-Phone voice and video calls.	Skype	1 June 2010
Devices	An online device management service that allowed users to centrally access and manage the synchronisation of files stored on their computers and mobile devices. Also allowed users to remotely access their computers from the internet via their web browser.	Integration into OneDrive	?
Events	Enables managing and planning different types of events and sharing them with others using Calendar, Spaces and Alerts.	Windows Live Groups (now discontinued); Calendar	3 September 2009
Expo	Allowed users to post online classifieds and search for listings posted by other users.	—N/a	31 July 2008
Favorites	Synchronized the user's favorites between computers and allowed for the sharing of favorites.	OneDrive	14 April 2009
FrameIt	Extended the functionality of digital photo frame devices, allowing users to customise the content delivery from multiple sources such as RSS feeds.	—N/a	15 December 2010
Gallery	A center for collections of developers' add-ons for Windows Live Messenger, Photo Gallery, Movie Maker, Writer, Toolbar, Spaces, and Live.com, as well as Windows Vista Sidebar and SideShow gadgets.	Windows Live Plug-ins (Discontinued)	1 October 2011
Groups	Enabled users to create their social groups for sharing, discussion and coordination.	Integration into OneDrive	?
Home	Provided a central location to access Windows Live services, monitor status information, and navigate to other Windows Live sites and services.	—N/a	18 February 2013
Help Community	Collection of forums and message boards that allowed communication with other users of Windows Live products.	Microsoft Answers	6 June 2008
Mesh	File sharing and synchronization service based on FolderShare and Live Mesh technologies. Supported PC-to-PC and PC-to-Cloud synchronisation, and synchronisation of program settings such as Internet Explorer and Microsoft Office between multiple computers. Also allowed users to remotely access their computers via the internet.	OneDrive	2012
Office Live Workspace	Offered 5GB of storage space for storing Microsoft Office Word, Excel, PowerPoint, and Outlook documents and lists online and sharing them with others. Office Live Workspace did not offer collaboration or editing capabilities however.	Office Web Apps (later rebranded Office Online, Office on the web and Microsoft 365)	21 January 2011
OneCare Safety Scanner	Free PC scanning and health service to help delete viruses and other threats. Included a registry cleaner, disk cleaner and defragmenter, network open port scanner, and comprehensive virus and spyware scanner.	Microsoft Safety Scanner	15 April 2011
Personalized Experience	An all-in-one home page featuring a customisable RSS aggregator, gadgets, and search tools.	My MSN	30 March 2010
Plug-ins	A central repository for collections of developer plug-ins for Windows Photo Gallery, Windows Movie Maker, and Windows Live Writer.	—N/a	?
QnA	A question and answer service which allowed users to ask questions, tag them according to topic, and gain points and reputation for answering other users' questions.	MSN QnA (now discontinued)	21 May 2009
Search Center	A desktop search program which provided a unified local and remote indexed search from a unified interface.	Windows Search 4 (now part of Windows Vista and Windows 7)	12 December 2006
Shopping	An online shopping comparison website which allowed users to compare items and prices of over 40 million products from more than 7000 online stores.	Bing Shopping (now discontinued)	20 February 2007
Spaces	A blog and social networking service which allowed users to create personalized blogs, add friends, and upload photos.	Migration to WordPress or Sina blogs in China	16 March 2011
Sync and Live Mesh	File synchronization which allowed files and folders between two or more computers to be in sync with each other or with the cloud storage on the web. Live Mesh also enabled remote desktop access via the internet using a web browser.	OneDrive	31 March 2011
TV	An additional program for Windows Media Center which provided access to Windows Live Spaces, Messenger, and Call on large-screen monitors or TVs.	—N/a	24 June 2008
Video Messages	Combined digital video with e-mail into a service that allowed all webcam users to create, send, and receive video messages to anyone in their contact list, even when they are offline.	Skype	21 July 2010
Web Messenger	Online version of Windows Live Messenger which allowed users to talk online and in real-time with others from within a web browser.	Integration into all services	30 October 2008
WiFi Center	Allowed users to search for wireless networks that are available and display information about them.	—N/a	16 February 2007
WiFi Hotspot Locator	A website which allowed users to locate wireless internet hotspots worldwide and view their positions on a map using Bing Maps.	MSN WiFi Hotspots (now discontinued)	16 February 2007

== Software ==
Microsoft has released several computer programs with the "Windows Live" brand, a summary of which is included below. All except Windows Live OneCare are freeware and published in a software suite called Windows Essentials (formerly Windows Live Essentials). Essentials programs are designed to integrate well with each other, within Windows, and with other Windows Live services such as OneDrive and Outlook.com. Windows Live OneCare on the other hand, was a commercial consumers utility marketed with a software as a service licensing model.

Service	Description	Fate
Family Safety	Parental controls similar to Windows Vista's Parental Controls feature	Integrated into Windows 8 and later
Mail	Desktop mail and calendar client designed to succeed Outlook Express on Windows XP and Windows Mail on Windows Vista, with full RSS support	Integrated into Windows 8 and later
Movie Maker	A video editing program for consumers	Discontinued, most functionality integrated into Photos app, a feature which was called Windows Story Remix (later Video Editor)
Messenger	Instant messaging app	Replaced by Skype
Messenger Companion	An add-in for Internet Explorer that allows users to share a webpage with their friends on Windows Live, see links to webpages the user's friends have shared and comment on these shared pages.	Discontinued
OneCare	A suite of computer security programs with antivirus program, backup utility, and a personal firewall.	Discontinued; functionality is partially offered by Microsoft Security Essentials, Windows Defender, System Center Endpoint Protection, Windows Backup and Windows Firewall.
Toolbar	A toolbar plug-in for Windows Internet Explorer, which allows quick access to a user's Windows Live Spaces, Hotmail, Favorites and Live Search from a button on the toolbar.	Replaced by Bing Desktop and Bing Bar
Photo Gallery	Image organizer that makes posting photos to SkyDrive and Facebook easier	Discontinued; functionality is partially offered by Photos app in Windows 10 and 11, and OneDrive app.
Writer	Desktop blog publishing tool that can publish to popular blogging services and make use of SkyDrive for photo storage.	Discontinued; open sourced as Open Live Writer in late 2015.

== Windows Live Butterfly ==
The Windows Live Butterfly awards program (formerly the MSN Butterfly program) was a program whose members were given the benefit of new Microsoft software to test before the beta releases went public and they were in direct contact with the program managers for Windows Live products.

Microsoft had initiated the Windows Live Butterfly program in order to recognize the contributions made by exemplary beta testers. Prospective 'butterflies' were selected by the Windows Live product team and were nominated for a term of one year, after which they could be renominated.

The Windows Live Butterfly program was closed in June 2009.

== User interface ==
All Windows Live websites sported a common theme. Different themes have been used on the sites with each phase of product release, called "Waves". Each Wave had a set of online services and desktop programs (Windows Essentials). The web services are labelled by each Wave, for example, Hotmail Wave 4. The programs from Windows Essentials are usually called by a year number, for example, Windows Live Messenger 2011. The design of the themes highly resembles the themes of Windows Aero.

=== Blue Vapor/Flair/Wave 1 ===
The Windows Live Flair header

Most original Windows Live applications and services used a visual theme known as Blue Vapor or Flair. The header consisted of a turquoise blue gradient that softly fades to white downward, with bright, curved, energy lines inside to create depth.

One can click on the silver orb at the left of the header to access every Windows Live service from a drop-down list. The header also contained a search bar for Windows Live Search.

=== Wave 2 ===
Windows Live 2.0 header

With the public release of the Windows Live Wave 2 Suite, a new visual theme was released to resemble Windows Vista's theme, Aero. The header is especially reminiscent of File Explorer's command bar in Windows Vista, and the silver orb's drop-down menu is themed off of Windows Vista's context menu.

The header's navigation menu left of the search bar contained shortcuts to four services. From left to right: Windows Live Home; Windows Live Hotmail; Windows Live Spaces; and Windows Live OneCare.

=== Wave 3 ===
Windows Live 3.0 header

Windows Live received a complete overhaul as Microsoft released a set of new themes for their Windows Live Wave 3 services, which allow users to customize their pages on Windows Live using a set of predetermined background pictures. Several of these themes are dynamic and change according to the time of day and the current weather conditions of the user.

The default header theme is a bright sky blue that fades to white downwards, with energy lines inside to create depth. In addition, the header's navigation menu was reorganized to include the following services, from left to right: Windows Live Home; Profile; People; Hotmail; and Photos. The silver orb from previous designs was also replaced by the More and MSN drop-down lists.

=== Wave 4 ===
Windows Live Wave 4 header

In addition to the themes provided in Windows Live Wave 3, the release of Windows Live Wave 4 provided additional themes for users to customize their pages on Windows Live, with several dynamic themes that change according to the time of day and weather conditions at the user's location. Several of these newly added themes are similar to wallpapers originating from Windows 7.

In addition, the Windows Live Wave 4 header features a reorganized dynamic navigation menu that displayed the number of the user's current online contacts and the number of unread e-mails, as well as an in-built Windows Live Web Messenger service allowing users to connect to the Microsoft Messenger service and Facebook chat service to chat with their online contacts while browsing any Windows Live properties using a web browser. From left to right, the dynamic navigation menu contains: Hotmail; Windows Live Web Messenger; Office Web Apps; and Windows Live Photos (which later became part of OneDrive).

== See also ==
In addition to Windows Live, which is mainly aimed at individuals, Microsoft brands other properties as "Live", including:

- Xbox Live (a multiplayer gaming and content-delivery system for Xbox)
- Games for Windows – Live (multiplayer gaming service for Microsoft Windows)
- Office Live. Office Live merged into Windows Live during the Wave 4 update. Microsoft merged Office Live into the Windows Live team in January 2009.
