= Windows Live Spaces =

Former blogging website from Microsoft

- The Windows Live Spaces logo.

- Windows Live Spaces homepage
- Developer: Microsoft
- Final release: Wave 4 (Build 15.3.6553.0608) / June 7, 2010
- Type: Social network service Blog
- Website: Archived official website at the Wayback Machine (archive index)

Windows Live Spaces was Microsoft's blogging platform and social network service. The site was originally released in early 2004 as MSN Spaces to compete with other social networking services, and re-launched in 2006 as a part of a shifting of community services away from the MSN brand. Windows Live Spaces received an estimated 27 million (27,000,000) unique visitors per month as of August 2007. Despite being considered a useful messaging and communication tool, Windows Live Spaces has been criticized as not being as powerful as some of its alternatives. It was shut down in 2011 due to low viewership.

== Features ==
Features of Windows Live Spaces included a blogging system, photo gallery, lists, friends, a guestbook, and a social profile. A Spaces page could be personalized with "gadgets", modules that enabled further customization, HTML code, and media playlists. Contact cards were also used in other Windows Live applications and services to summarize the recent content added to a Space. RSS feeds were available for content on a space.

== History ==
=== Beginning ===
Windows Live Spaces began as MSN Spaces and was launched in early December 2004 with the aim of allowing its users to reach out to others by publishing their thoughts, photos and interests in an easy and compelling way. With this goal, MSN Spaces found itself competing with similar services like MySpace and Yahoo!'s 360°.

As well as allowing users to share their thoughts, photos and interests, MSN Spaces users were given over 100 varied themes and several different page layouts to choose from when designing their MSN Space. Users also had the option to set access rights for visitors to their MSN Space based on the relationship between them (e.g. Friends, Family etc.). Visitors were also granted when their contacts' had updated their MSN Space.

=== Rebranding ===
Windows Live Spaces layout as of July 2007

On August 1, 2006, MSN Spaces became part of the Windows Live services platform, and was rebranded as Windows Live Spaces. There were various, obvious differences between MSN Spaces and Windows Live Spaces, the most instantly evident being a redesigned layout engine. This allowed users greater flexibility in terms of the layout of their Space, for example, it allowed the ability to move the "Title and Tagline" module, where before the upgrade it was permanently fixed to the top of the page. The change also resolved some oft-criticised characteristics of MSN Spaces, such as the alignment of content on the computer screen.

As part of the rebrand and upgrade, the URL for all MSN Spaces members were moved to keep in line with the Windows Live branding. For example, a URL of thespacecraft.spaces.msn.com was moved to thespacecraft.spaces.live.com, with the old URL redirecting to the new one.

=== Closure ===
On September 27, 2010, Microsoft announced that it would discontinue Windows Live Spaces, and in partnership with Automattic, a free opt-in migration of user blogs to WordPress.com will be offered to Windows Live Spaces users. Beginning January 4, 2011, users were not able to make changes to Spaces, but contents were still viewable and downloadable. Windows Live Spaces was fully shut down on March 16, 2011.

== Censorship ==
Windows Live Spaces censored the words that a user can choose when naming their Space, prohibiting for example the word whore or the so-called "seven dirty words". In addition, Microsoft has received criticism for censoring the words "democracy" and "freedom" under its Chinese portal.

== See also ==
- Windows Live
- Windows Live Groups
