= Arthur Fry =

American scientist (born 1931)

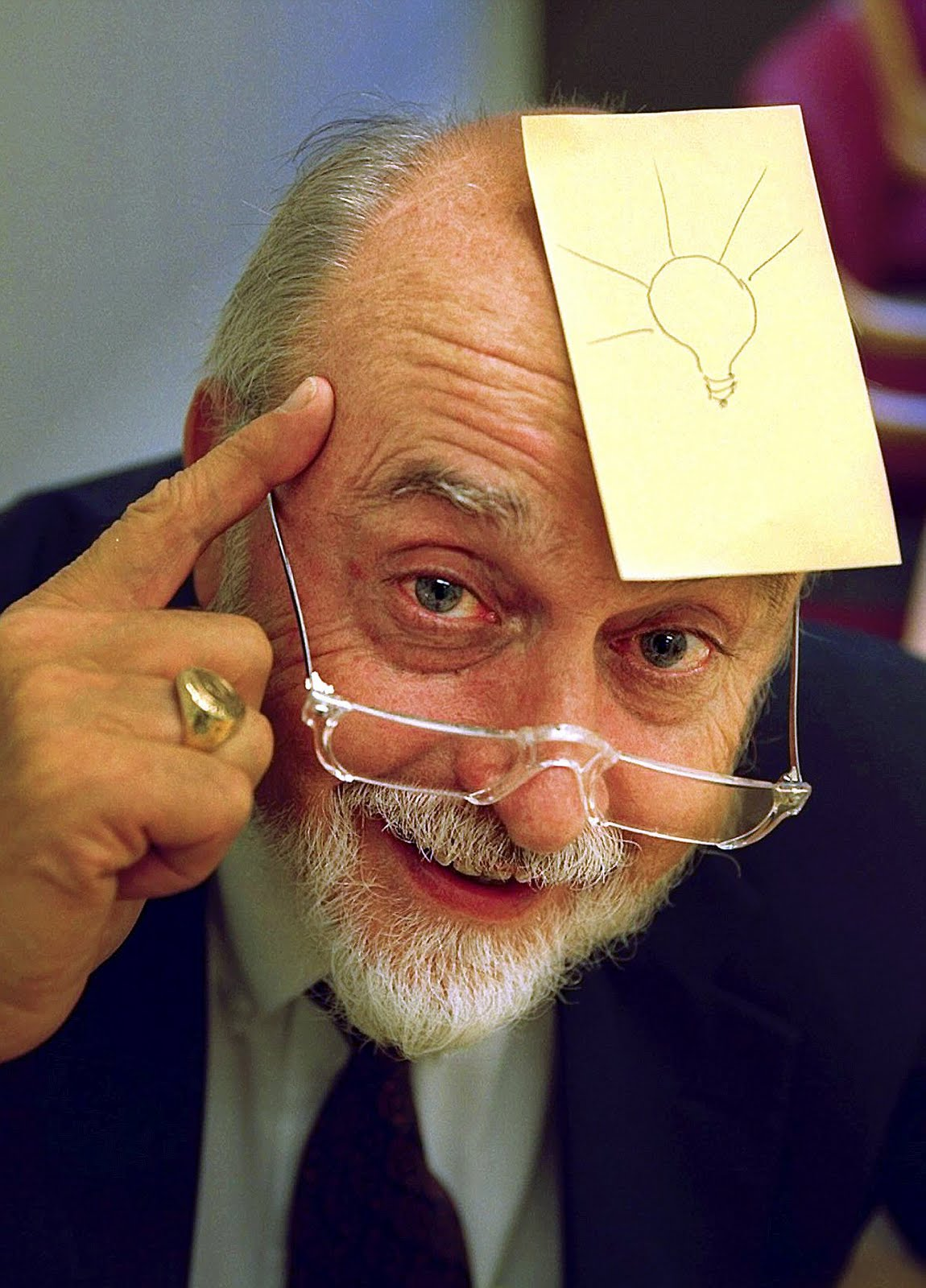
- Fry with a Post-it Note on his forehead
- Born: August 19, 1931 (age 94); Owatonna, Minnesota, U.S.
- Known for: Post-it Note creation

Arthur "Art" Fry (born August 19, 1931) is an American inventor and scientist. He is credited as the co-creator of the Post-it Note (though this is disputed by some), an item of office stationery manufactured by 3M. As of 2006, Post-it products are sold in more than 100 countries.

== Life ==
Fry was born in Owatonna, Minnesota and subsequently lived in Iowa and Kansas City, Missouri. He received his early education in a one-room rural schoolhouse. In 1953, while still enrolled in college, Fry took a job at 3M (then called Minnesota Mining and Manufacturing Company) as a new product development researcher. He worked in new product development throughout his career at 3M until his retirement in the early 1990s.

Fry earned a BS in chemical engineering at the University of Minnesota in 1955.

The item for which he is best known was created in 1974. That year, Fry attended a seminar which was given by another 3M scientist, Spencer Silver, and came up with the idea of using Silver’s adhesive to anchor his (Fry’s) bookmark in his hymn book. Fry then utilized 3M's sanctioned "permitted bootlegging" policy, which allows employees to spend some of their work time on projects of their own choosing, to develop the idea. The original notes' canary yellow color was chosen by chance, from the color of the scrap paper available at the lab next door to the Post-it team. Fry provided 3M employees with a prototype of the product, and individuals started exchanging messages, demonstrating the product's communicative effectiveness. Post-it Notes as we know them were patented by Fry in 1993 as a "repositionable pressure-sensitive adhesive sheet material".

== Success ==
It took a few years for the concept to come to fruition, due to both technical problems with production and management's doubts about the product's saleability. Post-it Notes were released to the national market in 1980. In 1981, 3M named Post-it Notes its Outstanding New Product. In 1980 and 1981, the Post-it Note team received 3M's Golden Step Award, given to teams who create major new products that are significantly profitable. 3M named Fry a corporate researcher in 1986. He is also a member of 3M's Carlton Society and Circle of Technical Excellence.

Fry currently resides in Saint Paul, Minnesota. He was mentioned in the 1997 film Romy and Michele's High School Reunion as the true inventor of Post-its.

In 2003 the Post-it Note played a central role in a new play titled Inside a Bigger Box that premiered in New York at the 78th Street Theatre Lab (written by Trish Harnetiaux and directed by Jude Domski). In conjunction with the show Harnetiaux, Domski and the artist non-profit NurtureART curated an International Post-it Note Art exhibit and a panel discussion took place with various artists. Post-it Note inventor Arthur Fry participated in the panel which was curated by Museum of Modern Art (MoMA) head of design Paola Antonelli.

During the summer of 2004, Fry acted as a judge for eCybermission, an Army-sponsored Math and Science competition.

In 2008 Post-it helped sponsor a drama series in Taiwan, Fated to Love You, a romantic comedy about a hard-working young woman who would complete any task left to her on a Post-it. The drama constantly features Post-it Notes in the storyline, and in episode 9 the lead male character cited Art Fry as the creator of Post-it Notes as well as the success the product had for 3M.

In 2010, Art Fry was inducted into the National Inventors Hall of Fame.

In 2025, the Post-it Note was included in Pirouette: Turning Points in Design, an exhibition at the MoMA featuring "widely recognized design icons [...] highlighting pivotal moments in design history."

=== Competing claims ===
Inventor Alan Amron claimed to have disclosed the technology used in the Post-it Note to 3M in 1974. His 1997 suit against 3M was settled and 3M paid Amron. As part of the settlement, Amron undertook not to make future claims against the company except if ever a breach of the settlement agreement should occur. In 2016, he launched a further suit against 3M, asserting that 3M were wrongly claiming to be the inventors, and seeking $400 million in damages. In September 2016, the case was dismissed.
