= Microsoft Gadgets =

Single-purpose applications on a Microsoft Windows desktop screen

Microsoft Gadgets is a discontinued platform of lightweight single-purpose applications, or software widgets, that can sit on a Microsoft Windows user's computer desktop, or are hosted on a web page. According to Microsoft, it will be possible for the different types of gadgets to run on different environments without modification, but this was not the case.

The gadgets and the Windows desktop Sidebar were a hallmark feature in Windows Vista and Windows 7 editions of the operating system. Subsequently, Microsoft deemed them to be security vulnerabilities and discontinued developing and providing Microsoft Gadgets, which were no longer available by the time Windows 8 and 10 rolled out. Independent third party programs providing similar functionality, such as Rainmeter, continue to be developed and provided for later versions of Windows.

== Types of Microsoft's gadgets ==
1. Web gadgets – run on a web site, such as Windows Live Home, Personalized Experience, or Spaces.
2. Desktop gadgets – run on the desktop or, in Windows Vista, run docked onto the Windows Sidebar.
3. SideShow gadgets – run on auxiliary external displays, such as on the outside of a laptop or even on an LCD panel in a keyboard, and potentially mobile phones and other devices.

== Web gadgets and Windows Live ==
Web gadgets can run on Web sites such as Windows Live Home, Windows Live Personalized Experience, and Windows Live Spaces.

Windows Live Home lets users add RSS feeds in order to view news at a glance. Building off Microsoft's start.com experimental page, Windows Live Home can be customized with Web Gadgets, mini-applications that can serve almost any purpose (e.g. mail readers, weather reports, slide shows, search, games, etc.). Some gadgets integrate with other Windows Live services, including Mail, Search, and Favorites.

Users can create multiple site tabs and customize each with different feeds, gadgets, layouts, and color schemes.

== Desktop gadgets ==
Adding Desktop Gadgets

Desktop gadgets are desktop widgets; small specialized applications that are generally designed to do simple tasks, such as clocks, calendars, RSS notifiers or search tools. They can also be used to control external applications such as Windows Media Center.

A panel, or sidebar, is found on either the right side (default) or the left side of the Windows desktop in the Windows Vista operating system. Gadgets can be placed on this sidebar, and they are automatically aligned on it. Gadgets can also be placed elsewhere on the screen, which generally causes them to expand and display more information.

In Windows 7, the sidebar is removed, although gadgets can somewhat similarly be aligned on any side of the screen. Gadgets are now toggled between the two sizes via a button in Windows 7.

== Device gadgets and Windows Sideshow ==
Windows SideShow is a new technology that lets Windows Vista drive small auxiliary displays of various form factors, offering bite-size pieces of information. These include displays embedded on the outside of a laptop lid or on a detachable device, enabling access to information and media even when the main system is in a standby mode. Data can also be displayed on cell phones and other network-connected devices via Bluetooth and other connectivity options.

The display can be updated with a number of different kinds of information, such as contacts, maps, calendar, and email. This can then be consulted while the mobile PC is otherwise powered down. Since the underlying platform is so power-efficient, it can run for hundreds of hours without draining a notebook battery, while still providing always-on access to data and multimedia content.

SideShow is coupled to the Windows Vista Sidebar capability – that is, Sidebar Gadgets are easily ported to be compatible with SideShow secondary display applications. However, hardware and silicon providers can also provide native capabilities to allow for richer multimedia applications such as text, image, audio and video decode / playback. For example, a notebook with an in-lid display could be used as an MP3 player while powered down, with the notebook battery providing hundreds of hours of playback time because of the low power footprint that the Sideshow platform maintains.

== Discontinuation ==
According to Microsoft, Gadgets were discontinued because they have "serious vulnerabilities", "could be exploited to harm your computer, access your computer's files, show you objectionable content, or change their behavior at any time"; and "an attacker could even use a gadget to take complete control of your PC". Gadgets were completely removed in Windows 8.

== See also ==
- Dashboard (Mac OS)
- Widget engine
- Windows Live
- Windows SideShow
- Windows Desktop Gadgets
