= Stickies (Apple) =

Notetaking application for Apple Macintosh computers

- Stickies 10.3 from macOS Tahoe
- Developer: Apple
- Stable release: 10.3
- Operating system: System 7, Mac OS 8, Mac OS 9, macOS
- Type: Post-it note-like notetaking software

Stickies is an application for Apple Macintosh computers that puts Post-it note-like windows on the screen for the user to write short reminders, notes and other clippings. Contents are automatically stored, and restored when the application is restarted.

An unrelated freeware program with the same name and similar functionality is available for Microsoft Windows.

Similar applications (described as "desktop notes") are available for most operating systems.

== History ==
In 1994, the first version of Stickies was written by Apple employee Jens Alfke and included in System 7.5. Alfke had originally developed it in his free time as Antler Notes and intended to release it as shareware, doing business as Antler Software. Apple planned to acquire it from him, but realized that they already legally owned it under the terms of his employment.

During the transition to Mac OS X in 2001, Stickies was rewritten in Cocoa, and is still included in macOS, with features such as transparent notes, styled text, lists, and the ability to hold pictures.

In 2005, as part of Dashboard, Apple created a simplified software widget version of Stickies.

The ability to collapse note windows, which is present in all versions of Stickies, is a holdover from System 7.5's WindowShade feature. The window titlebar button layout, which is unusual for a modern macOS application, is retained from Mac OS 8.

In macOS Big Sur, the icon has been changed to look like a stack of sticky notes in a rounded square design.

== Features ==
The Stickies application currently supports the following usage scenarios:

- Float above all windows: Press Command-Option-F with a sticky note selected and it will float above any other windows that are visible.
- Translucent: Press Command-Option-T with a sticky note selected and it will become translucent.
- Embed other media: Add other media besides text, such as QuickTime movies, PDFs, images, just by dragging them into the sticky note.
- Backup data: Stickies keeps all information in a self-contained database. The database can be backed up by copying the file StickiesDatabase, which is located in a user's Library directory ("~/Library/StickiesDatabase").
- Search data: Press Command-F to search for words or phrases within a sticky note.
- Create a note from selection: In a Cocoa-based application (such as the Safari web browser), select some text and press Command-Shift-Y or use the Services menu to create a new sticky note with the text selection.
