= Redmi Note 9 Pro =

Redmi mid-range LTE smartphones

Redmi Note 9 Pro Redmi Note 9 Pro Max
- First released: Note 9 Pro: May 5, 2020; 6 years ago Note 9 Pro Max: May 12, 2020; 6 years ago
- Predecessor: Redmi Note 8 Pro
- Successor: Redmi Note 10 Pro
- Related: Redmi Note 9 / Redmi Note 5G
- Compatible networks: GSM / HSDPA / 4G LTE
- Colors: Note 9 Pro: Tropical Green, Glacier White, Interstellar Gray; Note 9 Pro (India)/Pro Max: Aurora Blue, Glacier White, Interstellar Black
- Dimensions: 165.8 × 76.7 × 8.8 mm (6.53 × 3.02 × 0.35 in)
- Weight: 7.37 oz (209 g)
- Operating system: Initial; Android 10 with MIUI 11 interface Current; Android 12 with MIUI 14 interface
- System-on-chip: All models: Qualcomm SM7125 Snapdragon 720G (8 nm)
- CPU: All models: Octa-core (2x 2.3 GHz Kryo 465 Gold & 6 x1.8 GHz Kryo 465 Silver)
- GPU: All models: Adreno 618
- Memory: 4/6/8GB RAM
- Storage: 64/128GB
- Removable storage: microSDXC, up to 512 GB
- SIM: 2× Nano-SIM
- Battery: Li-po 5,020 mAh (non-removable)
- Charging: Note 9 Pro (India): 18W wired Note 9 Pro (global): 30W wired Note 9 Pro Max: 33W wired USB Type-C 2.0
- Rear camera: Note 9 Pro / Pro Max: 64MP Primary AI lens, wide-angle with 1/1.72" Samsung GW1 sensor (f/1.9); 8MP Ultra-wide (119°) f/2.2; 5MP Macro; 2MP Depth Note 9 Pro (India): Note 9 Pro / Pro Max: 48MP Primary AI lens, wide-angle with Samsung ISOCELL Bright GM2 sensor (f/1.8); 8MP Ultra-wide (119°) f/2.2; 5MP Macro; 2MP Depth All lenses with auxiliary lens, features LED flash, HDR and panorama Video: 4K@30fps, 1080p@30/60/120fps, 720p@960fps with gyro-EIS
- Front camera: Note 9 Pro (Global/India): 16MP wide-angle (f/2.5); Lens size: 1/3.06"; Note 9 Pro Max: 32MP wide-angle Lens size: 1/2.8"; All models support HDR and panorama Video: 1080p@30/120fps
- Display: 6.67" IPS LCD DotDisplay; 1080 × 2400 pixels 20:9 aspect ratio ~395 ppi density
- Connectivity: Wi-Fi 802.11 a/b/g/n/ac, dual-band, Wi-Fi Direct; Bluetooth 5.0, A2DP, LE; Positioning: GPS; GLONASS; GALILEO; BDS; NavIC (Note 9 Pro Max only)
- Data inputs: Fingerprint (side-mounted); Accelerometer; Gyro; Proximity; Compass

The Redmi Note 9 Pro and Note 9 Pro Max are high-range Android smartphones manufactured by Xiaomi and branded by Redmi. It was released on May 5, 2020 () for the Note 9 Pro global, March 17 for the Indian market (sales resume on March 25 due to the first sales end in minutes) and on May 12, 2020 for the Note 9 Pro Max.

The Note 9 Pro Max has a different camera island and it is similar to the Indian Redmi Note 9 Pro. All models feature the Corning Gorilla Glass 5 screen protector.

== Specifications ==
=== Design ===
All the models' frame were made of plastic with front and back sides are made of glass (Gorilla Glass 5). The Note 9 Pro was available at Tropical Green, Glacier White, Interstellar Gray colors, while the Indian Note 9 Pro and Note 9 Pro Max were available at Aurora Blue, Glacier White, and Interstellar Black colors.

=== Hardware ===
Both devices are powered by the Qualcomm SM7125 Snapdragon 720G chipset and the Adreno 618 graphics processor. It also has an octa-core composed of 2 Kryo 465 Gold cores clocking at 2.3GHz and 6 Kryo 465 Silvers clocking at 1.8GHz.

The devices were equipped with a 5020 mAh lithium-polymer battery and has different supportable charging speeds (in watts):

- Note 9 Pro (India): 18W wired
- Note 9 Pro (Global): 30W wired (also has 33W fast charging)
- Note 9 Pro Max: 33W wired

=== Internal storage configuration ===
Storage	Memory	Applications
64GB	4GB RAM	Note 9 Pro (India)
64GB	6GB RAM	Note 9 Pro / Pro Max
128GB	4GB RAM	Note 9 Pro (Global / India)
128GB	6GB RAM	All Models
128GB	8GB RAM	Note 9 Pro / Pro Max
All models use UFS 2.1

== Software ==
All models were pre-installed with Android 10 mobile OS with MIUI 11 User Interface. It received multiple updates:

Software update (2020-2022)
Date	UI	OS	References	Notes
March-May 2020	MIUI 11 (pre-installed)	Android 10 (pre-installed)		
November 2020	MIUI 12	Android 11		Initial release in Europe
June 2021	MIUI 12.5	Android 11		
June 2022	MIUI 13	Android 12		

== Availability ==
The devices were released by global phase rollout by region.

=== Redmi Note 9 Pro ===
- March 17, 2020 (India)
  - India
- May 5, 2020 (Global)
  - Initial global release
- May 18, 2020
  - Singapore
- May 26, 2020
  - Philippines
- June 8, 2020
  - United Kingdom

=== Redmi Note 9 Pro Max ===
- May 12, 2020
  - India

== Reception ==
=== Note 9 Pro ===
In terms of design, REVU PH stated for a positive feature: "The Redmi Note 9 Pro goes for a simple yet premium look. Xiaomi protects the front and back of the phone with Corning Gorilla Glass 5 and combines that with a plastic frame. The Glacier White color our test unit comes in looks sleek, clean, and feels smooth and grippy in hand."

It also captures image with detailed photos and color reproduction with the main camera. The battery life was long, with 14 hours of on-screen usage from battery tests from PhoneArena.

=== Note 9 Pro Max ===
The Note 9 Pro Max can charge from 0 to 52% in 30 minutes. However, a reviewer from Gadgets360 noticed that the device started heating while charging.

== See also ==
- Redmi Note 9
