= Redmi Note 9 =

Android smartphone made by Xiaomi

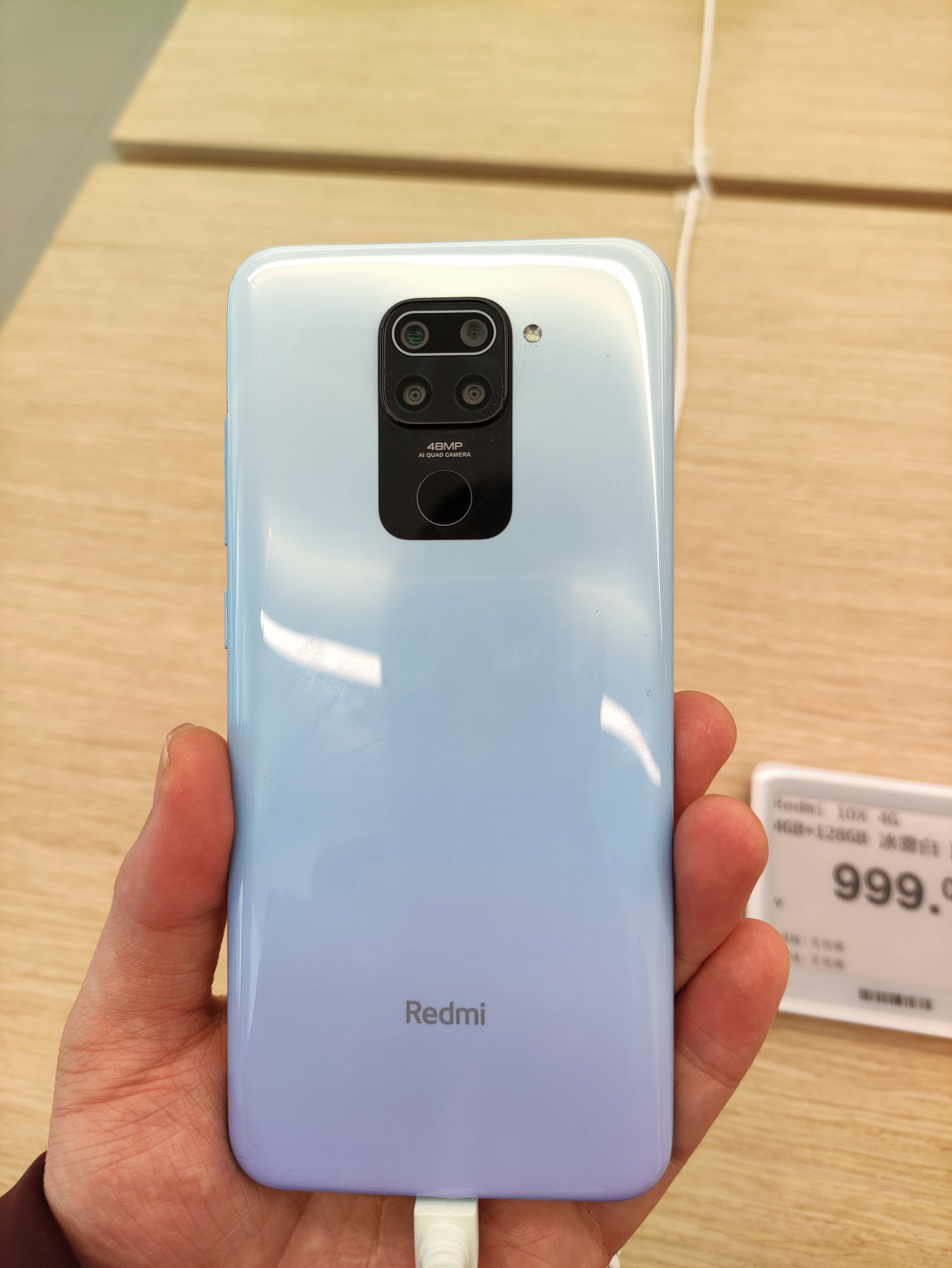
- Redmi 10X 4G (Redmi Note 9) in Polar White
- Brand: Redmi
- Manufacturer: Xiaomi
- Type: Phablet
- Series: Redmi Note
- First released: Note 9 Pro (India): 17 March 2020; 6 years ago Note 9S: 30 April 2020; 6 years ago Note 9 Pro (global): 5 May 2020; 6 years ago Note 9/Pro Max: 12 May 2020; 6 years ago 10X 4G: 26 May 2020; 6 years ago Poco M2 Pro: 14 July 2020; 6 years ago Note 10 Lite: 2 October 2021; 4 years ago
- Predecessor: Redmi Note 8
- Successor: Redmi Note 10
- Related: Redmi 10X; Redmi 9 Redmi Note 9 4G; Redmi Note 9 Pro 5G
- Compatible networks: 2G, 3G, 4G and 4G LTE
- Form factor: Slate
- Dimensions: Note 9/10X 4G.: 162.3 mm × 77.2 mm × 8.9 mm (6.39 in × 3.04 in × 0.35 in) Note 9S/Pro: 165.8 mm × 76.7 mm × 8.8 mm (6.53 in × 3.02 in × 0.35 in) Note 9 Pro Max/Note 10 Lite: 165.5 mm × 76.7 mm × 8.8 mm (6.52 in × 3.02 in × 0.35 in)
- Weight: 209 g (7.4 oz); Note 9 / 10X 4G: 199 g (7.0 oz)
- Operating system: Original: Note 9/9S/Pro/Pro Max/10X 4G: Android 10, MIUI 11; Note 10 Lite: Android 10, MIUI 12; Poco M2 Pro: Android 10, MIUI 11 for Poco; Current: Note 9/10X 4G: Android 12, MIUI 13; Note 9S/Pro/Pro Max/10 Lite: Android 12/12L, MIUI 14; Poco M2 Pro: Android 12, MIUI 14 for Poco
- System-on-chip: Qualcomm Snapdragon 720G; Note 9 / 10X 4G: MediaTek Helio G85
- CPU: Octa-core (2x 2.32 GHz Kryo 465 Gold + 6x 1.8 GHz Kryo 465 Silver); Note 9 / 10X 4G: (2x 2.0 GHz Cortex-A75 + 6x 1.8 GHz Cortex-A55)
- GPU: Adreno 618; Note 9 / 10X 4G: Mali-G52 MC2
- Memory: LPDDR4X RAM Note 9: 3/4 GB; Note 9S/Pro (India)/10X 4G/Poco M2 Pro: 4/6 GB; Note 9 Pro (global): 6 GB Note 9 Pro Max: 6/8 GB
- Storage: 64/128 GB; UFS 2.1
- Removable storage: microSDXC, expandable up to 256 GB
- Battery: 5020 mAh; Poco M2 Pro only: 5000 mAh
- Charging: Note 9/9S/Pro (India)/10X 4G/Note 10 Lite: Fast charging 18W Note 9 Pro (global)/Pro Max: Fast charging 30W Poco M2 Pro: Fast charging 33W
- Rear camera: Note 9/10X 4G/Note 10 Lite: 48 MP, ƒ/1.8, 26mm, 1/2", 0.8 μm (wide) + 8 MP, ƒ/2.2, 13mm, 1/4", 1.12 μm (ultrawide) + 2 MP, ƒ/2.4, 1/5", 1.75 μm (macro) + 2 MP, ƒ/2.4 (depth) Note 9 Pro (India)/9S/Poco M2 Pro: 48 MP, ƒ/1.8, 26mm, 1/2", 0.8 μm (wide) + 8 MP, ƒ/2.2, 13mm, 1/4", 1.12 μm (ultrawide) + 5 MP, ƒ/2.4, 1/5", 1.75 μm (macro) + 2 MP, ƒ/2.4 (depth) Note 9 Pro (global)/Pro Max: 64 MP, ƒ/1.9, 26mm, 1/1.72", 0.8 μm (wide) + 8 MP, ƒ/2.2, 13mm, 1/4", 1.12 μm (ultrawide) + 5 MP, ƒ/2.4, 1/5", 1.75 μm (macro) + 2 MP, ƒ/2.4 (depth) All: PDAF, AF, LED flash, HDR, panorama 4K@30fps, 1080p@30/60/120fps, 720p@960fps, gyro-EIS; Note 9/10X 4G: 1080p@30fps
- Front camera: Note 9/10X 4G: 13 MP, ƒ/2.3, 29mm, 1/3.1", 1.12 μm, 1080p@30fps Note 9S/Pro/Poco M2 Pro: 16 MP, ƒ/2.5, 1/3.06", 1.0 μm, 1080p@30/120fps Note 9 Pro Max: 32 MP, 0.8 μm, 1/2.8", 1080p@30/120fps All: HDR, panorama
- Display: IPS LCD capacitive touchscreen 6.67 in (169 mm), 2400x1080 1080p (395 ppi with 20:9 aspect ratio), 16M colors, HDR10; Note 9 / 10X 4G: 6.53 in (166 mm),1536x2400 1080p, 19.5:9 aspect ratio
- Connectivity: Bluetooth 5.0; Wi-Fi 802.11a/b/g/n/ac (2.4 & 5 GHz), dual-band, WiFi Direct, hotspot A2DP, LE
- Data inputs: Sensors: Fingerprint scanner (capacitive); Accelerometer; Gyroscope; Proximity sensor Hall-effect sensor Magnetometer
- Codename: Redmi Note 9/10X 4G: Merlin/Merlinx Redmi Note 9 (NFC): Merlinnfc; Redmi Note 9S: Curtana; Poco M2 Pro: Gram; Redmi Note 9 Pro: Joyeuse Redmi Note 9 Pro Max: Excalibur
- SAR: Note 9: 0.84 W/kg (head); 0.9 W/kg (body) Note 9S: 0.96 W/kg (head); 0.4 W/kg (body); Note 9 Pro (global): 0.87 W/kg (head); 0.71 W/kg (body); Note 9 Pro (India): 0.9 W/kg (head 0.48 W/kg (body); Note 9 Pro Max: 0.88 W/kg (head); 0.47 W/kg (body) Poco M2 Pro: 0.91 W/kg (head); 0.56 W/kg (body) (EU)

The Redmi Note 9 is a line of Android-based mid-range smartphones as part of the Redmi Note series by Redmi, a sub-brand of Xiaomi Inc.

The smartphone was succeeded by Redmi Note 10, an upgraded version released in March 2021.

== Specifications ==
Variants	Redmi Note 9 Redmi 10X 4G	Redmi Note 9S Redmi Note 9 Pro (India) Redmi Note 10 Lite	Poco M2 Pro	Redmi Note 9 Pro (global) Redmi Note 9 Pro Max
Processor	MediaTek Helio G85	Qualcomm Snapdragon 720G		
Battery	5020 mAh		5000 mAh	5020 mAh
Rear camera	48 MP			64 MP
Ultra-wide angle camera	8 MP			
Depth sensor camera	2 MP			
Macro camera	2 MP	5 MP		
Front camera	13 MP	16 MP		16 MP (global); 32 MP (India)
NFC	No	No	No	Yes

=== Hardware ===
==== Design ====
===== Note 9 =====
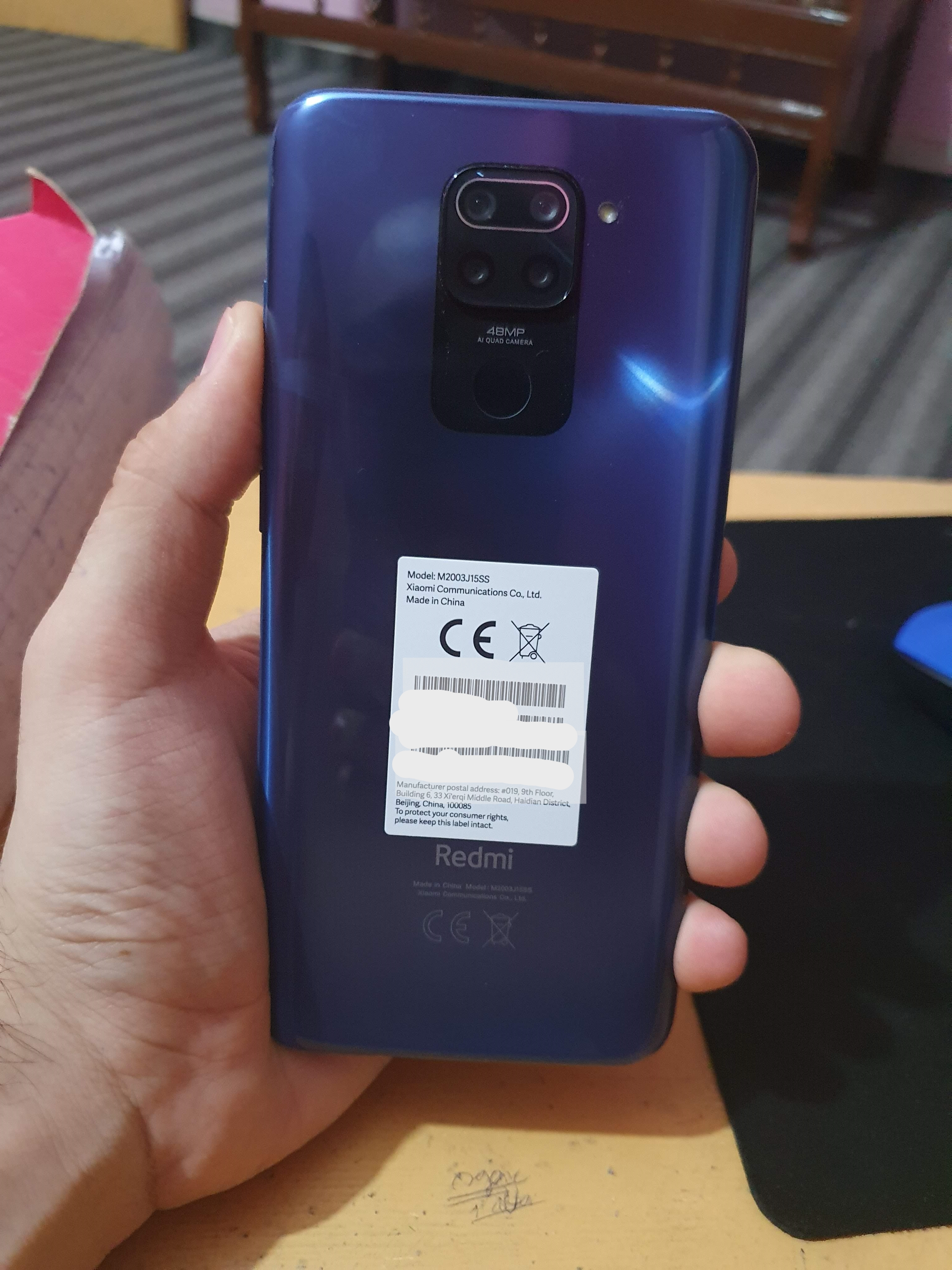
Back of a Redmi Note 9 in Midnight Grey

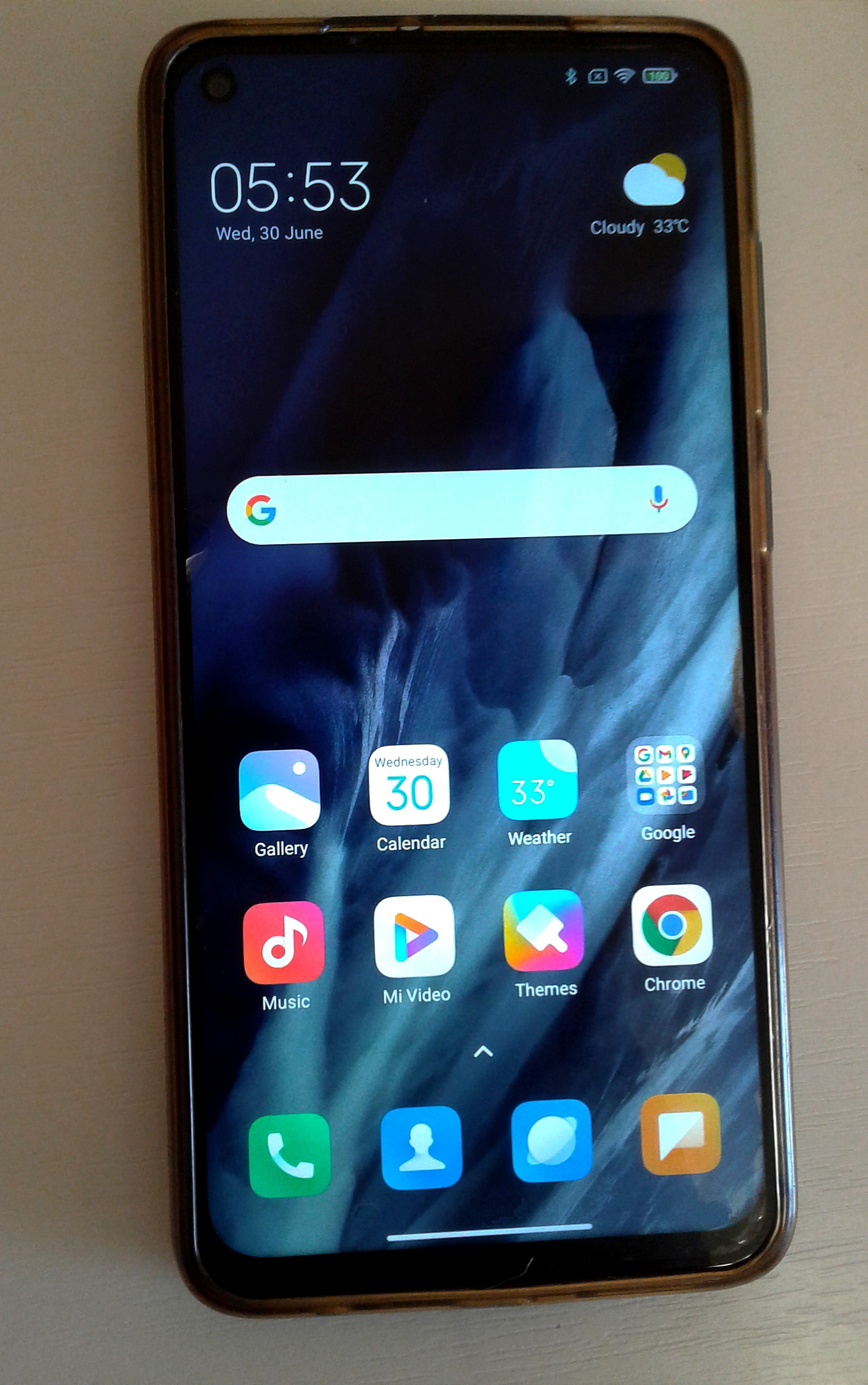
Redmi Note 9 with MIUI 11

The Note 9/10X 4G measures 162.3 mm × 72.2 mm × 8.9 mm (6.39 in × 2.84 in × 0.35 in) and weighs 199 grams (7.0 oz) which is heavier than usual for a 6.53-inch phone. The curved (slippery) back feels like glass, the front is made of Gorilla Glass 5, and the frame is made of plastic. The bottom half is heavier to prevent the device from tipping over and falling. The bezels and the camera bump are small.

In addition to the 6.53 in (166 mm) touchscreen, it has a power button and a volume up/down button located on the right side, an IR blaster on the top, and a USB-C port, a downward-firing speaker, and a headphone jack on the bottom. It has a hole punch in the left corner and a fingerprint scanner in the rear.

The Note 9/10X 4G has three colour options: Forest Green, Midnight Grey, and Polar White.

===== Note 9S/Pro/10 Lite (India) =====
The Note 9S/Pro/10 Lite (India) measures 165.8 mm × 76.7 mm × 8.8 mm (6.53 in × 3.02 in × 0.35 in) and weighs 209 grams (7.4 oz). The curved (slippery) back and the front is made of Gorilla Glass 5, and the matte frame is made of plastic. The bezels are small, however, the phone does wobble because of a camera bump raising the phone. It is also splash-proof and has a P2i water repellent coating.

In addition to the 6.67 in (169 mm) touchscreen, it has a power/fingerprint scanner button and a volume up/down button located on the right side, microSD slot in the left side, an IR blaster on the top, and a USB-C port, a downward-firing speaker, and a headphone jack on the bottom. It has an earpiece above the display, and a notification LED.

The Note 9S/Pro/10 Lite (India) has three colour options: Aurora Blue, Glacier White, and Interstellar Gray.

===== Note 9 Pro (global)/Pro Max =====
The Note 9 Pro (global) measures 165.8 mm × 76.7 mm × 8.8 mm (6.53 in × 3.02 in × 0.35 in). For the Note 9 Pro Max, it measures 165.5 mm × 76.7 mm × 8.8 mm (6.52 in × 3.02 in × 0.35 in). Both of them weigh 209 grams (7.4 oz). The curved back with a gloss finish and the front is made of Gorilla Glass 5, and the frame is made of plastic. The bezels, which are always painted in black, are small (except the chin at the bottom), however, the phone does wobble because of a camera bump raising the phone. It is also splash-proof and has a P2i water repellent coating.

In addition to the 6.67 in (169 mm) touchscreen, it has a power/fingerprint scanner button and a volume up/down button located on the right side, SIM card and microSD slot in the left side (triple slot), an IR blaster on the top, and a USB-C port, a downward-firing speaker, and a headphone jack on the bottom. It has an earpiece and a notification LED above the display.

The Note 9 Pro (global)/Pro Max has three color options: Tropical Green, Glacier White, and Interstellar Gray.

===== Poco M2 Pro =====
The Poco M2 Pro measures 165.8 mm × 76.7 mm × 8.8 mm (6.53 in × 3.02 in × 0.35 in) and weighs 209 grams (7.4 oz). The curved back with a gloss finish and the front is made of Gorilla Glass 5, and the matte frame is made of plastic. It has a striped pattern on the phone that takes up two-thirds of the rear, which resembles the original Google Pixel.

In addition to the 6.67 in (169 mm) touchscreen, it has a recessed power/fingerprint scanner button and a volume up/down button located on the right side, microSD slot, an IR blaster, and a USB-C port, a downward-firing speaker, and a headphone jack.

The Poco M2 Pro has three colour options: Out Of The Blue, Green and Greener, and Two Shades of Black.

==== Chipset ====
The Note 9 uses the octa-core MediaTek Helio G85 containing 2 2 GHz Cortex-A75 core, 6 1.8 GHz Cortex-A55 core, and an 1 GHz Mali-G52 MC2 GPU), which is a small revision of the MediaTek Helio G80. The GPU's difference is the GPU clock at 950 MHz on the MediaTek Helio G80, and 1 GHz on the MediaTek Helio G85.It is also known as decent gaming processors.

The rest of the series uses the octa-core Qualcomm Snapdragon 720G which contains 2 2.3 GHz Kryo 465 Gold core, 6 1.8 GHz Kryo 465 Silver core, and an Adreno 618 GPU.

==== Display ====
The Note 9 has a 6.53 in (166 mm) 2340x1080 1080p (395 ppi with 19.5:9 aspect ratio), 16M colors, Gorilla Glass 5, and IPS LCD with 1242:1 contrast ratio, 370 nits of brightness with 100% brightness, and up to 466 nits with Auto mode turned on.

The rest of the series has a slightly larger display, at 6.67 in (169 mm) 2400x1080 with a 20:9 aspect ratio, rated for 1500:1 contrast ratio and 450 nits of brightness, and has support for HDR10. In the Poco M2 Pro, there is a daylight mode that triggers once the phone detects bright lighting. The mode increases the saturation and contrast of the display. The mode reduces colour accuracy and makes the colours unnatural, especially when playing games or looking at pictures. This model of redmi supports lineage os as well.

The Note 9S/Pro (India) has 421 nits of brightness with 100% brightness, up to 575 nits of brightness with Auto mode turned on, and 1369-1389:1 contrast ratio. The Note 9 Pro (global)/Pro Max has 456 nits of brightness with 100% brightness, up to 616 nits of brightness with Auto mode turned on, and a 1265-1285:1 contrast ratio.

==== Camera ====
The Note 9 uses a quad rear camera array, which is a 48 MP ƒ/1.8 26 mm 1/2" 0.8 μm main camera with PDAF, an 8 MP ƒ/2.2 13 mm 1/4" 1.12 μm 118° ultra-wide camera, a 2 MP ƒ/2.4 1/5" 1.75 μm macro camera with autofocus, and an 2 MP ƒ/2.4 depth sensor camera. It also has a 13 MP ƒ/2.3 29 mm 1/3.1" 1.12 μm front camera. It can shoot at 1080p/30 fps with the rear camera and the front camera.

The Note 9S/Pro (India)/Poco M2 Pro has the macro camera upgraded to 5 MP, and the ultra-wide camera slightly wider at 119˚. It also has a 16 MP f/2.5 1/3.06" 1 μm front camera, and can shoot at 4K/30 fps, 1080p/60/120 fps, and 720p/960 fps with the rear camera, 1080p/120 fps with the front camera, and has gyro-EIS.

The Note 9 Pro (global)/Pro Max has the main camera upgraded to a 64 MP ƒ/1.9 26 mm 1/1.72" 0.8 μm main camera, and the Note 9 Pro Max has a 32 MP 1/2.8" 0.8 μm front camera.

==== Battery ====
The entire line uses a non-removable 5020 mAh Li-Po battery, except for the Poco M2 Pro which uses a slightly smaller non-removable 5000 mAh Li-Po battery. The Note 9/9S/Pro (India) has 18 W fast charging, the Note 9 Pro (global) and the Note 9 Pro Max has 30 W fast charging, and the Poco M2 Pro has 33 W fast charging.

=== Software ===
==== User interface ====
The series is powered by Android. Among other features, the software allows users to maintain customized home screens, which can contain shortcuts to applications and widgets for displaying information. Shortcuts to frequently used applications can be stored on a dock at the bottom of the screen. A tray accessed by dragging from the top of the screen allows users to view notifications received from other apps. It contains toggle switches for commonly used functions.

The series uses MIUI 12.5.1 based on Android 11. MIUI 12.5 has a minimalistic design and some elements of the original Android, such as the toggle switches in the notification tray, and the app drawer in some markets. The app drawer can be customized, such as sorting different apps into categories, and the colour of the background. MIUI 12.5 also supports dark mode, making the system background turn black, and icons darken as well, reading mode, and night mode. The notification tray can be customized, such as the looks of the notification cards. MIUI 12.5 also has per-app background activity control. The task switcher shows all of the opened apps in two columns. MIUI 12.5 has split-screen capability accessible through pressing and holding an application in the task switcher.

==== Features and apps ====
MIUI 12.5 is a slight improvement over MIUI 12 and comes as an intermediary between MIUI 12 and the forthcoming MIUI 13. It has notification and alarm sounds that change their sounds depending on the time. MIUI 12.5 continues to have Mi's own gallery, music, video player, and document viewer. There is a paid option for streaming in the music and video player in some markets. MIUI 12.5 also has a Security app, which scans for malware, clears RAM space, manages permissions, quota usage, and battery-draining apps. In some countries, the first-party applications will show ads. This is one way Xiaomi manages to lower the cost of their phones.

=== Android fork ===
The Redmi Note 9 series have gone through 3 major Android updates, those being Android 10, Android 11 and the last major release being Android 12.

For Xiaomi's interface, or in general terms used to describe other brands interfaces as Android fork, those being MIUI 11, MIUI 12, MIUI 13 (the last one for EEA variant and the last one for Redmi Note 9/Redmi 10X 4G too.) and the last fork release being MIUI 14 (on Global, Indian, Indonesian and Turkey variant.).

== Reception ==
=== Redmi Note 9 ===
GSMArena rated the phone 3/5 stars. They praised the sturdy design, the battery life, the Night Mode, the AF on the macro camera, the headphone jack, microSD card slot, the IR blaster, and the feature-rich OS. They criticized the mediocre display, the performance, the overall camera quality, the lack of 4K recording, the slow UI, and the charging speed.

=== Redmi Note 9S/Pro/Pro Max/10 Lite ===
TechRadar reviewer Aakash Jhaveri and Tom Bedford gave the Note 9S / Pro (India) a 4/5 star rating, stating that the phone was a "killer deal for the price" despite the conservatism of the Note 9S (no 90 Hz or more display, no next-gen cameras, no 30 W+ fast charging, and no unique design). They praised the long battery life, the performance. They criticized the buggy pre-release software, the notifications from the pre-installed apps, and the speaker.

GSMArena rated the series (except Redmi Note 9) 3.8/5 stars. They praised the screen, the battery, the performance for the price, good image quality for the cost, the design, and the availability of NFC (Note 9 Pro (global) / Pro Max only). They criticized the uneven lighting around the hole punch, the lack of NFC (Note 9S/Pro Indian version), and the charging speed (Note 9S/Pro/10 Lite Indian version).
