= Steed (FTP client) =

File Transfer Protocol client for Windows

- Developers: French Fry, SAS
- Stable release: 1.2.1.1169 / June 27, 2017; 8 years ago
- Written in: C# .NET v4.0
- Operating system: Windows, 7, 8, 8.1, 10
- Available in: English, French, German
- Type: FTP client
- License: Proprietary
- Website: http://www.frenchfrysoftware.com/steed

Steed was a shareware FTP client for Windows developed by French Fry.

== Features ==
Steed allows users to transfer files using FTP and SFTP protocols and access their bucket and containers on S3 and Azure for storing data in the cloud. User bookmarks are kept in sync across multiple devices by using OneDrive or Dropbox. Steed's UI provides a native Windows experience, and provide features specific to the operating system, like Jumplist, tabbed thumbnails, and high DPI support. Steed has a tabbed interface in order to manage multiple connections. After a ten-day trial period, the product must be purchased.

== See also ==
- File Transfer Protocol
