= Sticky Notes =

Desktop notes application included in Microsoft Windows

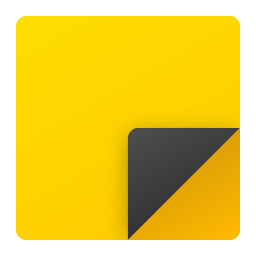

- Screenshot of Sticky Notes (previous version) on Windows 10 with insight enabled. The upper half with a yellow background is the typed note. Red text indicates an insight has been identified. The white with black highlight is the selected text for the insight shown in the lower portion of the sticky note.
- Developers: Tom Revell; Microsoft
- Stable release: 6.1.4.0 / 29 October 2024; 20 months ago
- Operating system: Windows (XP Tablet PC Edition and higher)
- Type: Desktop notes
- License: Proprietary
- Website: onenote.com/stickynotes

Sticky Notes is a desktop notes application included in Windows 7, Windows 8, Windows 8.1, Windows 10 and Windows 11. The app loads quickly and enables users to quickly take notes using post-it note–like windows on their desktop.

Sticky Notes originated in Windows XP Tablet Edition in 2002 and was included with Windows Vista as a gadget for the Windows Sidebar before becoming a standalone program. According to Microsoft, there were eight million monthly Sticky Notes users as of April 2016. Since 2024 it is an integral part of Microsoft OneNote.

== Development ==
The original Sticky Notes was a gadget included with Windows Vista. Gadgets were continued in Windows 7, though Sticky Notes itself became a standalone app built on the Win32 platform, that could still open at startup. This version did not directly support pen input. The default color is yellow, but five other colors are offered. Sticky Notes have jumplists and a taskbar preview, which shows the notes in a stack. Sticky Notes are automatically saved. This version was reused in Windows 8 and the initial releases of Windows 10.

In the Windows 10 Anniversary Update, released in 2016, a new version of Sticky Notes built on the Universal Windows Platform was introduced. It can be launched as a standalone app or part of the Windows Ink workspace. The latter method causes the space behind the notes to become blurred. The new version directly accepts pen input and can recognize words and letters in handwritten text, basic text formatting, pictures. It is designed to be stick to the desktop or move around. The new Sticky Notes provides stock information when a ticker is typed or written, and it provides flight info when a flight number is typed or written. It has Cortana integration and can create reminders from notes that include a date. Unlike the Windows 7 version, this version's taskbar preview shows a stock image rather than the notes a user has created. It originally did not have a jump list, but that was added back in version 1.6.2 on February 6, 2017. The app can run on Windows 10 (x86, x86-64, ARM) and Xbox.

This version of Sticky Notes is built in on Outlook.com and Microsoft Teams.

In August 2024, a new Sticky Notes app built on Win32 was released as a preview. This version has a redesigned look updated to match Windows 11 design principles. Unlike previous versions, this Sticky Notes is integrated with Microsoft OneNote. It added some new features such as always-on-top pinning ability.

== Cross-platform ==
Sticky Notes can sync notes across multiple devices, not just to Windows 10 devices, but also to iOS and Android devices running Microsoft OneNote and Outlook for Windows. A web client to edit sticky notes is also available on the OneNote website, at the obscure onenote.com/stickynotes (may not exist anymore) or is located at https://outlook.office.com/mail/notes location.

On Android devices, Microsoft Launcher can show sticky notes synced with a local instance of the OneNote app.
