= Alan Amron =

American inventor

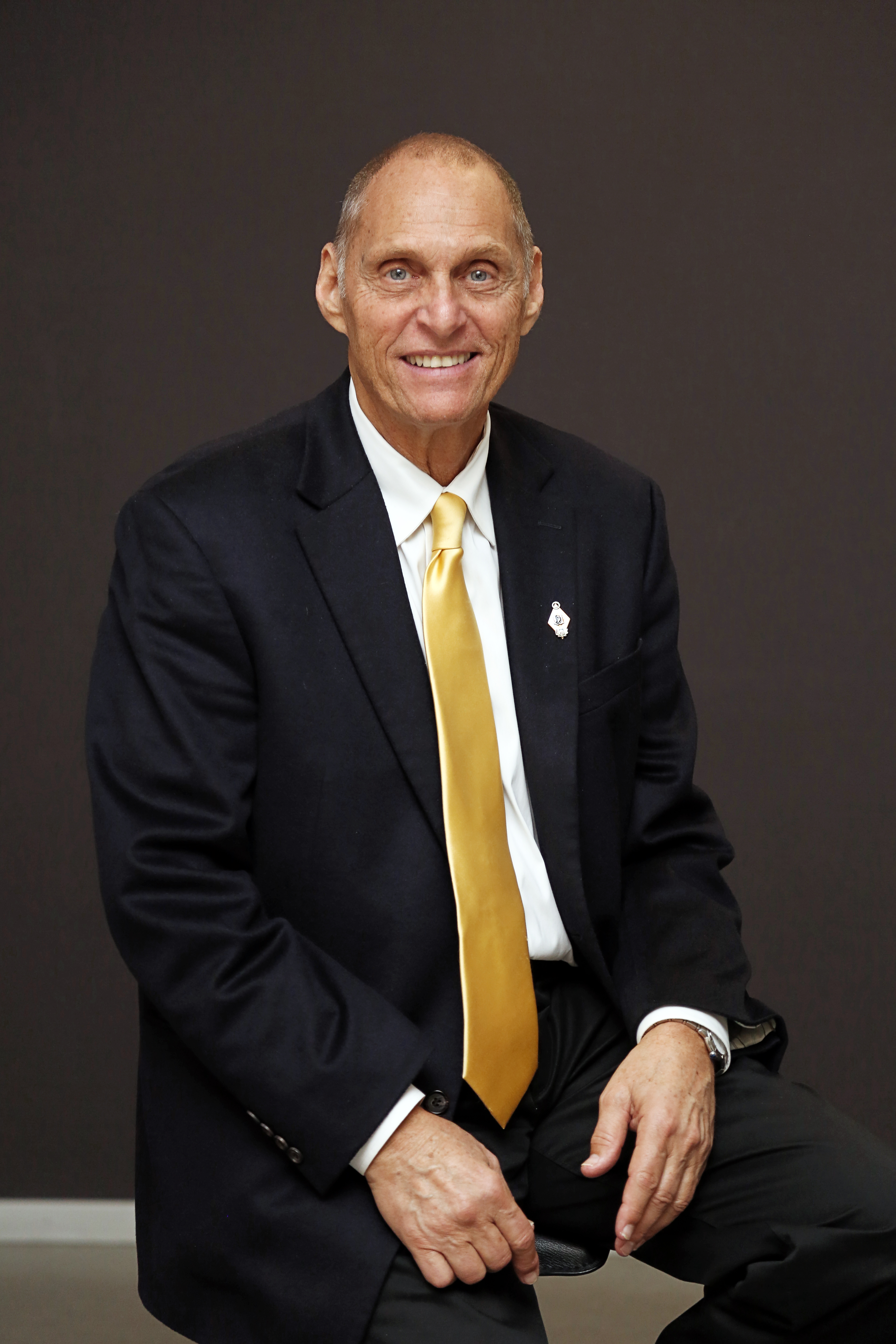
- Inventor of the Sticky Note Lecture 2016
- Born: November 20, 1948 (age 77); Brooklyn, New York
- Education: University of Memphis
- Known for: Photo Wallet, battery operated water gun and first down laser line
- Children: 2
- Website: https://patents.justia.com/inventor/alan-amron?page=4

Alan Amron (born November 20, 1948) is an American inventor who holds 40 United States patents. Amron invented the Photo Wallet and battery operated water guns.

He has claimed to be the inventor of the Post-it note sticky notes, for which he sued 3M in 1997 and agreed to a confidential settlement. In 2016, he sued 3M again over the same issue for $400 million. The case was dismissed because of the previous settlement.

== Inventions ==
Noteworthy Amron inventions include:

- The Photo Wallet, invented by Amron for his company VideoChip Technologies, was the first handheld battery-operated digital photo frame. It could display JPG and MPG files, and read Microsoft Excel and Microsoft Word documents. The product was licensed to Nikon.
- Amron invented the first battery-operated water gun. In the first year, this invention had earned him $250,000 in royalties.
- Amron has invented and designed a First Down Laser Line system, which would extend the concept of the computer-generated first down yellow line seen on-screen during televised football games by projecting such a line on the physical field at the stadium. Amron met with the NFL in 2003 and again in 2009, and in 2013 a league spokesman said "We have not been convinced that it would work for us, but we are open to further discussion after the season." A similar Leading Mark Laser invented by Amron was used in the 2013 and 2014 NCAA National track and field championships at the University of Oregon. Amron's laser line projection system was also used to replace the costly painted yellow cautionary lines in warehouses.

== Campaign to reunite the Beatles ==
In 1976 Amron created the International Committee to Reunite the Beatles. Amron placed radio and newspaper advertisements asking everyone to donate a dollar, which would then be given to the Beatles to reunite for a concert. Also known as "Let It Be", Amron's committee was one of several attempts to reunite the band in the mid and late 1970s, but it had the distinction of being a people-based campaign. Author Nicholas Schaffner wrote in 1978 that things did not "augur well" for Let It Be, since Amron engaged the same PR company as Paul McCartney – Solters and Roskin in New York – and McCartney immediately dropped the firm so as not to be a conflict, as a result.

Boxer Muhammad Ali took up the initiative, hoping that the four former Beatles would agree to donate the money to children in need around the world. His attorney, Spiros Anthony, said that Amron and New York businessman Joel Sacher had been the "catalysts" for Ali's involvement. In January 1977, the Daily Herald newspaper reported George Harrison as saying: "Will it happen? I suppose so."

== Post-It Note ==
Amron has made claims to be the inventor in 1973 of the technology used on the Post-It note and disclosed his invention to 3M in 1974. His 1997 suit against 3M resulted in a confidential settlement. As part of the settlement, Amron undertook not to make future claims against the company as part of an agreement that said that 3M would not claim to be the inventor of the Post-It note.

However, in 2016, he launched a further suit against 3M, suing them in federal court in Fort Lauderdale, asserting that 3M were wrongly claiming to be the inventors, and seeking $400 million in damages. Amron said, "l just want them to admit that l am the inventor and that they will stop saying that they are the inventor", "Every single day that they keep claiming they invented it damages my reputation and defames me."

When Amron was asked about how he invented the sticky note, he replied, "In 1973 I had to leave a note for my wife and didn't have any scotch tape to post it so I invented a way to post it without magnets pins or tape."

"I had just gotten married in 1973 and my wife wasn't home and I had to leave a message for her that I was running out to a meeting. I took a piece of - we called it memo paper in those days - and I wrote on the memo that I was going to a meeting that I'd be back later. I wanted to post it on the refrigerator. But I looked around the house for Scotch tape and I couldn't find it. So I saw some gum on the counter. And while my mind was working I was looking at the gum and not being able to find the Scotch tape, I took the gum, put a piece in my mouth and started chewing. While I was chewing I was thinking about the tackiness of the gum. And I took a little piece of the gum out of my mouth and I kneaded it. I mushed it around. I got a little dust off the counter. I put it in the little piece of gum and I mushed it around and squashed it right on the refrigerator. Then I put the note on it and I pulled it a little bit to see if it held and it held and I left. When I got home my wife was very impressed with the fact that I left her a note and the fact that the note was still on the refrigerator and then came right off without it leaving a residue mess when she took the note off."

"She suggested and I agreed that it was a great product and I started to develop the adhesive for it. The adhesive had to be tacky enough to stick, repositionable enough to position it on a surface or a paper or a refrigerator. We didn't have magnets in those days and I couldn't use duct tape because it would have left a residue on the refrigerator. So I was working on an adhesive that would be tacky enough to be put on the back of a memo pad or piece of paper, that you could put it onto another piece of paper or to a refrigerator or a window or a door or something like that and reposition it."

3M claims that two of their chemists, Spencer Silver and Arthur Fry invented the bookmark in 1974, with Silver having developed the adhesive in 1968 and Fry having the idea to use it to hold bookmarks in his hymnal in 1974, which 3M then originally sold as the Press 'n' Peel bookmark.

In September 2016, the case was dismissed, to which Amron said, "it's not surprising that big money beat little money."

== Bicoastal Airlines a Condo in the sky ==
In 1983, Alan Amron partnered with Herb Lande, Hollywood producers Jerry Weintraub and Robert Finkelstein to start a condominium luxury airline, with two flights a day to and from New York and Los Angeles. Stars, studios and corporations would buy and own the seats. As reported by the New York Post archives on September 29, 1983, Tina Sinatra designed the interior of the planes.
