= Jump list =

Jump list may refer to:

- Jump lists, menu options available on taskbar icons in Microsoft Windows
- Skip list, a probabilistic data structure

== See also ==
- Jumplist
