= Desktop notes =

Post-it note-like computer application

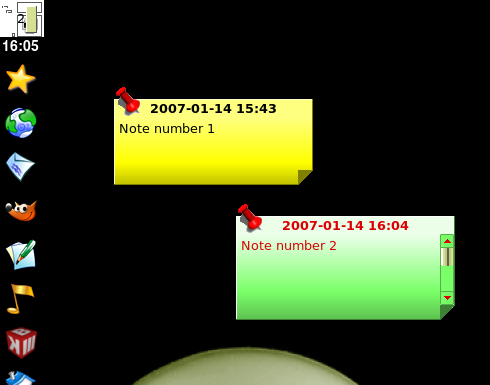
Screenshot of Knotes, a desktop note application for KDE

Desktop notes are computer applications that allow putting Post-it note-like windows on the screen, with reminders, short notes and other clippings. They are typically rectangular and yellow, like their physical counterpart, but most applications support other colours and more elaborate designs.

The earliest-known desktop note application is "Note pad" made for the GEOS system for the Commodore 64 in 1985. For the Macintosh, the Stickies application was developed by Jens Alfke and included in System 7.5, released in 1994. A number of applications have duplicated the functionality of Stickies on other platforms.

macOS has its own built-in desktop note functionality with the Stickies application and, from Mac OS X Tiger through macOS Mojave, with Dashboard, an application that has notes and other desktop widgets.

On Microsoft Windows, desktop note applications have been included by default since Windows Vista, which has the Notes "gadget". It is used as part of Windows Sidebar. As Microsoft states in its description, "Notes" can be used to "Capture ideas, notes and remainders in a quick and easy way." On Windows 7, the successor to Vista, this functionality is replaced by a stand-alone application called Sticky Notes, in which the notes can be freely repositioned on the screen.

On Linux, desktop notes have existed for a long period of time. The GNOME desktop environment had a built in "sticky notes" feature available, whereas KDE (K Desktop Environment) has a desktop notes application called Knote.

== See also ==
- Sticky Notes
- Desk Accessory
- Desktop widget
- Web annotation
