= Windows Ink =

Pen computing software suite in Windows 10

- Developer(s): Microsoft
- Included with: Windows 10 Anniversary Update and newer
- Type: Pen computing tools

Windows Ink is a software suite in Windows 10 that contains applications and features oriented towards pen computing, and was introduced in Windows 10 Anniversary Update.

The suite includes Sticky Notes, Sketchpad, and Screen sketch applications. On a Tablet PC that supports pen input, the Windows Ink Workspace icon in the taskbar is enabled by default, otherwise, it can be enabled manually by the user.

== Applications ==
The Windows Ink Workspace menu contains links to (from top to bottom):

1. Sticky Notes
2. Sketchpad
3. Screen sketch
4. Recently used (applications)
5. Suggested (applications available on Windows Store)

=== Sketchpad ===
Described as being "a simple blank canvas where you can quickly and easily draw an idea, doodle, create, and solve problems", it is a place where the user can sketch out whatever comes to their mind without launching a full blown drawing program such as SketchBook or Clip Studio Paint. It includes a small subset of features from full-blown drawing programs, such as a digital ruler, and pen options. When it is first run, it loads an image of an unfinished landscape. Own sketches can be saved as images. However, it is not possible to open and re-load a previously saved sketch.

=== Snip & Sketch (Screen sketch) ===
When the user opens the Windows Ink Workspace menu, a screenshot is taken of the screen and shown as the preview for the "Snip & Sketch" item in the menu. When the user taps it, they can draw over that screenshot using the same controls from the aforementioned Sketchpad. This feature is similar to the "Screen write" feature of Samsung Galaxy Note devices.
