= Windows Live Personalized Experience =

Personal web portals developed by Microsoft

- Live.com logo.

- A customizable Windows Live homepage
- Website type: Portal, Homepage
- Dissolved: March 15, 2010; 16 years ago
- Owner: Microsoft
- Website: Archived official website at the Wayback Machine (archive index)
- Commercial: Yes
- Launched: November 1, 2005; 20 years ago
- Current status: Discontinued

Windows Live Personalized Experience (also known as My.Live.com, previously Live.com) was a customizable portal launched by Microsoft in early November 2005. It was one of the first Windows Live services to launch.

== Features ==
Live.com lets users add RSS feeds in order to view news at a glance. Building off Microsoft's Start.com experimental page, Live.com could be customized with Gadgets, mini-applications that could serve almost any purpose (e.g. mail readers, weather reports, slide shows, search, games, etc.). Some gadgets integrated with other Windows Live services, including Hotmail, Live Search, and Favorites.

Users could create multiple site tabs and customize each with different feeds, gadgets, layouts, and color schemes, thus making it a competitor to iGoogle and Pageflakes among others.

== History ==
On December 14, 2004, Start.com, the predecessor to Live.com, began internal testing. On February 5, 2005, the first version, http://www.start.com/1, went live. On March 10, http://www.start.com/2 went live, and on June 3, http://www.start.com/3 went live. On September 1, they released to http://www.start.com/. On September 13, developer sites went live.

The Live.com domain was previously owned by Live Networks Inc., a producer of streaming network software. Microsoft's Live.com launched on November 1, 2005 with the Windows Live brand and various improvements. . By November 8 they had added Firefox support. On November 23 themes were added. On December 15, support for Opera 9, new gadgets, and other improvements went live. On December 20, the search engine was improved. January 27, 2006 saw support for images in RSS feeds. On February 28, the search box was updated. On March 7, Live.com was updated with a new look, more gadgets, and an improved interface. It also featured, for the first time, the new Windows Live Search (now Bing). Features included intelligent scrolling, dynamic image search, and saved searches. On March 30, other improvements were made, especially regarding the first run experience and persistence of search-only mode.

On September 12, 2006, Live.com officially came out of beta, and a beta version of Live.com Mobile was also released for mobile devices. In the following few days, MSN Search began redirecting to the new Windows Live Search, and the rollout was complete.

On August 3, 2007, Microsoft Japan revealed details for Windows Live 2.0 in its annual Business Strategic Meeting 2008, including a new version of Windows Live homepage. A new Windows Live portal, branded Windows Live Home, was expected to be released in Fall 2007, featuring a new interface design together with Windows Live ID improvements. Microsoft later confirmed that Windows Live Home is not a replacement for Live.com. On November 21, 2007, the Live.com team announced on their blog a new version of Live.com is in the works.

Because all online Windows Live services are located in subdomains of Live.com, the site was once the recognized home of Microsoft's "Live" movement. However, on April 17, 2008, Live.com was officially relocated to my.live.com with its name now referred to as Windows Live Personalized Experience. Live.com became the home to Live Search as part of Microsoft's movement to push their online search and advertising services. Windows Live Home became the official home portal for all Windows Live services instead. Windows Live Personalized Experience was updated on August 8, 2008 featuring the new Windows Live 2.0 theme.

When Bing launched in June 2009, Live.com started to redirect to Bing.com; Windows Live Personalized Experience was still accessible at the my.live.com address. It was announced in mid-January 2010 that Windows Live Personalized Experience would be discontinued as of March 15, 2010, while users are encouraged to use My MSN as a replacement service. In April 2010, my.live.com started redirecting to My MSN, and Live.com started redirecting to Windows Live Home.

== See also ==
- Bing
- Windows Live
- Windows Live Home
