= Windows Desktop Gadgets =

Widget engine for Windows Vista and 7

- Screenshot of Windows Sidebar, showing the analog clock, headlines and picture slideshow gadget
- Developer: Microsoft
- Operating system: Windows XP SP2 or later
- Included with: Windows Vista and Windows 7
- Predecessor: Active Desktop
- Successor: Live Tiles in Windows 8, Windows 8.1, and Windows 10
- Type: Desktop widget engine

Windows Desktop Gadgets (called Windows Sidebar in Windows Vista) is a widget engine for Windows Vista and Windows 7, part of the now discontinued Microsoft Gadgets widget platform. Its gadgets can perform various tasks, such as displaying the time and date, gathering RSS feed or Email information, allowing users to use tools such as sticky notes or timers, among other tasks.

Windows Sidebar was introduced with Windows Vista, in which it features a sidebar anchored to the side of the desktop. The gadgets can either be placed on the sidebar or anywhere on the desktop. In Windows 7, the sidebar was removed, but gadgets can still be placed on the desktop.

Windows Desktop Gadgets was discontinued in Windows 8. The Windows 8 Live Tiles can perform a similar function, but they are only visible when the Start menu is visible. They run in a more restrictive environment, making them less risky, but also less useful for some purposes, like system monitoring. Live Tiles too, was replaced by the widgets panel in Windows 11, but the widgets cannot be placed on the desktop and it is rather stuck on a unmovable UI than the freedom to move the gadgets. It also meant the addition of new gadgets like MSN games and a refined gadget interface.

== History ==
Windows Sidebar originated in a Microsoft Research project called Sideshow (not to be confused with Windows SideShow). It was developed in the summer of 2000, and was used internally at Microsoft. It included a clock, traffic reports, and IM integration.

Windows Sidebar appeared in build 3683 of Windows Longhorn circa September 2002 and was originally intended to replace the notification area and Quick Launch toolbar in Windows, but these plans were scrapped after the development reset in mid-2004. Windows Sidebar was rebuilt and began to appear in Windows Vista builds in the second half of 2005. Some reviewers and Macintosh enthusiasts have pointed out the Sidebar's similarities in form and function to Konfabulator (later Yahoo! Widget Engine), which appeared several years previously, and the Dashboard widget engine first included with Apple Inc.'s Mac OS X v10.4, which had been released a few months earlier.

In Windows 7, Windows Sidebar was renamed Windows Desktop Gadgets, and the sidebar itself was removed in Windows 7 since build 6471.

Windows Desktop Gadgets was included in all beta builds of Windows 8 up to build 8432 (fbl_loc) and did not make it to the final release. Instead, on July 10, 2012 (which is in the intervening time between the last beta of Windows 8 and its final release), Microsoft issued security advisory to disable Sidebar and Desktop Gadgets on Windows Vista and 7 because of a security vulnerability that could allow remote code execution.

== Overview ==
The window for searching and adding gadgets to the desktop. Users could scroll left and right through the pages and a search bar is included for searching gadget names (for example, “clock” for finding related clock gadgets).

Windows Desktop Gadgets is a feature of Windows Vista and Windows 7 (excluding the Windows Server family of the operating system). It hosts mini-applications or "gadgets" which are a combination of HTML, CSS, and JavaScript code. Their use cases include displaying system time or calendar date, downloading and displaying RSS feeds, controlling other software such as Windows Media Player, placing useful tools like Sticky Notes, and more.

In Windows Vista, gadgets can run docked in the sidebar, or float anywhere on the desktop. The sidebar also has multiple pages for lots of gadgets, and pages can be switched using the arrows at the top. It is also possible to run multiple instances of a gadget simultaneously. Windows Sidebar also works on Windows XP.

In Windows 7, the sidebar was not included, but gadgets can still be placed on the desktop, and a desktop context menu was added. In Windows 7, gadgets can snap onto the edges of a display or on other gadgets, and gadgets now have an option to change its size on the desktop from small to large.

Windows Vista is preinstalled with eleven gadgets: Calendar, Clock, Contacts, CPU Meter, Currency Conversion, Feed Headlines, Notes, Picture Puzzle, Slide Show, Stocks, and Weather. Several other gadgets available during the beta such as App Launcher, Feed Viewer, Number Puzzle, Recycle Bin, and Egg Timer never made it to the final release. Windows 7 adds a Media Center gadget and removes the Contacts, Notes, and Stocks gadgets.

Originally, Microsoft provided a link to a web site called Windows Live Gallery where additional Sidebar gadgets that have been created by third-party developers could be downloaded. The site was officially retired on October 1, 2011.

== See also ==
- Microsoft Gadgets
- Widgets (Windows 11)
- Windows SideShow for Device Gadgets
- Widget engine
- Desk accessory
- Yahoo Widgets
- Google Desktop
- Rainmeter
- Dashboard (macOS)
