= Post-it note =

Small piece of paper with a re-adherable strip of glue on its back

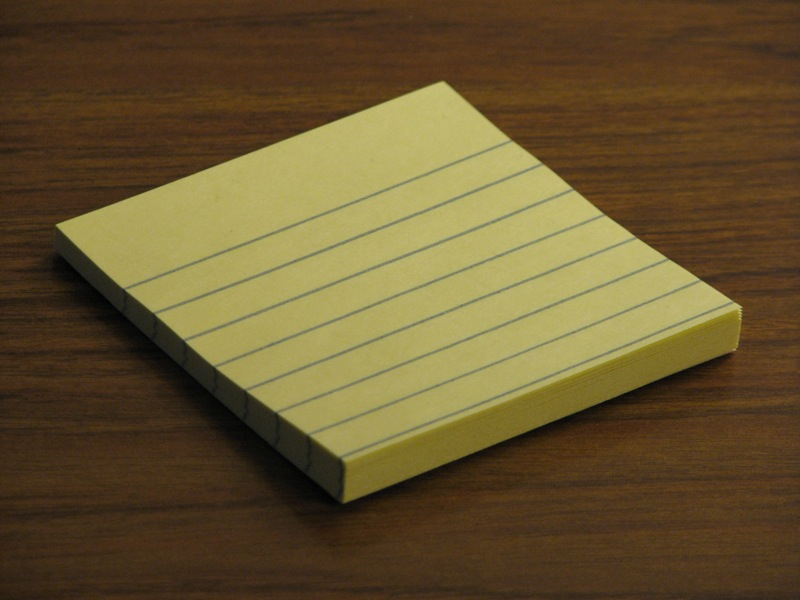
- A small pad of original style lined yellow Post-it brand notes
- Product type: Stationery, paper
- Current owner: 3M
- Country: Cynthiana, Kentucky, U.S.
- Introduced: 1977; 49 years ago
- Website: post-it.com

A Post-it note (or sticky note) is a small piece of paper with a re-adherable strip of glue on its back, made for temporarily attaching notes to documents and other surfaces. A low-tack pressure-sensitive adhesive allows the notes to be easily attached, removed, and even re-posted elsewhere without leaving residue. The Post-it's signature adhesive was discovered accidentally by a scientist at 3M. Originally small yellow squares, Post-it notes and related products are available in various colors, shapes, sizes, and adhesive strengths. As of 2026, there are at least 30 documented colors of Post-it notes. 3M's Post-it has won several awards for its design and innovation.

Post-its are versatile and can be used in various settings for various purposes. They are commonly used in classrooms and workplaces but can also be found in art, media, and social media. Post-its have also been used as tools for public engagement and persuasion.

Although 3M's patent expired in 1997, the "Post-it" brand name and the original notes' distinctive yellow color remain registered company trademarks, with terms such as "repositionable notes" used for similar offerings manufactured by competitors. While use of the trademark "Post-it" in a representative sense refers to any sticky note, no legal authority has ever considered it a generic trademark. (Note: See 3M Company v. Professional Gallery, Inc., Opposition No. 91173411, 2014 WL 3686877 (Trademark Trial and Appeal Board 2014) ("The above evidence leaves us in no doubt that Post-it is a famous mark for sticky notes."). Minn. Min. & Mfg. Co. v. Taylor, 21 F. Supp. 2d 1003, 1005 (D. Minn. 1998) ("3M owns a valid mark—'Post-it' ... (this) mark is strong. [T]he evidence submitted is sufficient to establish the fame of the 'Post-it' mark."). Minnesota Mining and Manufacturing Company v. Dole (Trademark Trial and Appeal Board 1997) ("This record establishes ... the fame of opposer's Post-it mark."). 3M Company (Republic of Turkey Turkish Patent Institute 2009) ("[I]t has been determined that the 'Post-it' trademark is a 'well known' trademark recognized broadly by everyone...").3M Company v. Ahmed, Opposition No.OP000402446 (United Kingdom Intellectual Property Office 2015). Minnesota Mining and Manufacturing Company v. D. Benito (Superior Court. Contentious, Madrid, Spain 2003). 3M Company v. Daval-Frerot (National Institute of Industrial Property, France 2016). 3M Norway AS v. Note-it AS, Opposition No. 200477 (Norwegian Board of Appeal for the Industrial Property Office 2005). 3M Company v. Xρηστοσ Λϵριδησ, Opposition No. B 002276247 (Office for Harmonization in the Internal Market (EUIPO) 2015). 3M Company v. Estates Indust. Co., Ltd., Invalidation No. 2013-890061, Control No. 1285551 (Japan Patent Office 2014).)

== History ==
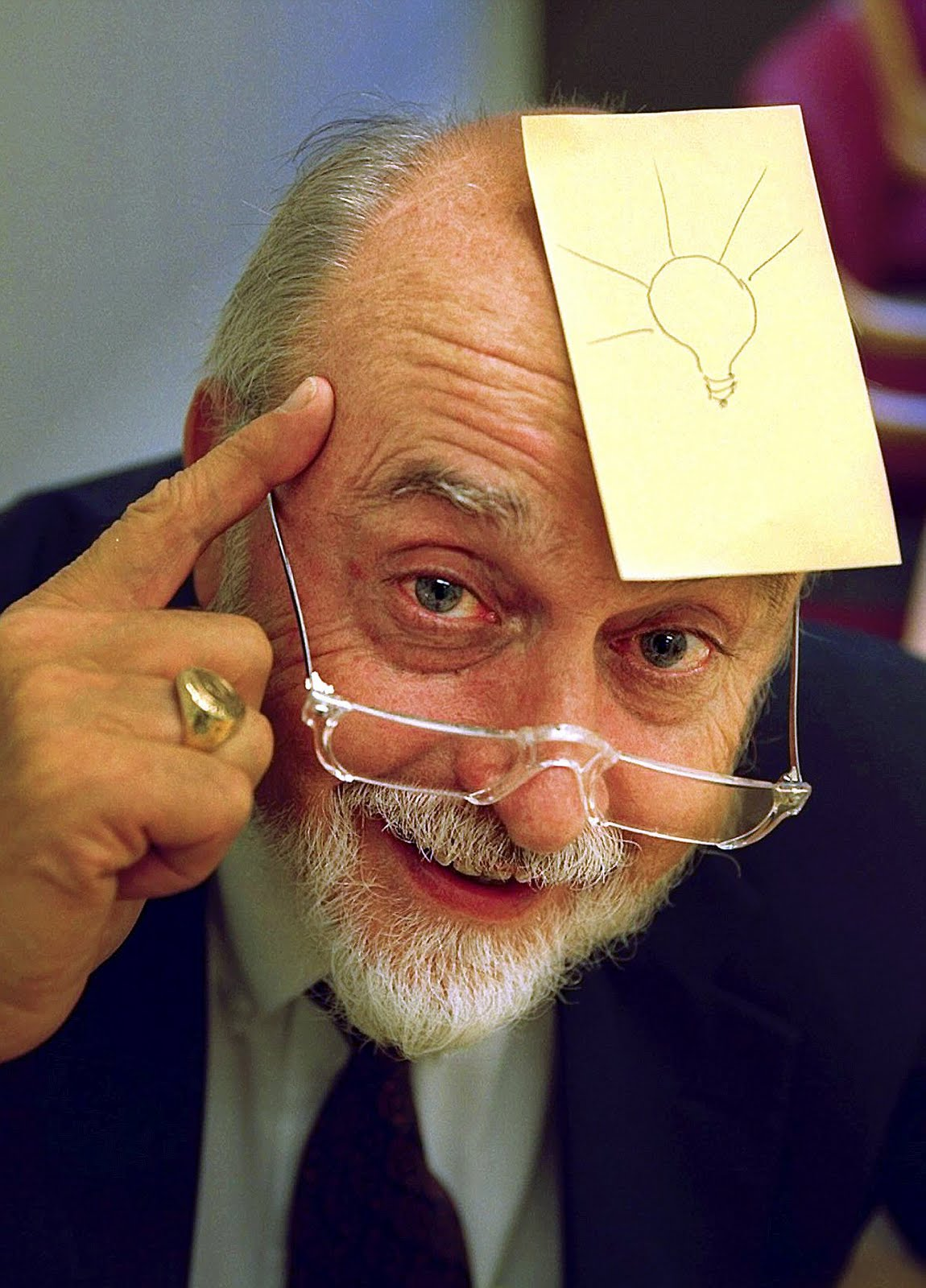
Arthur Fry, developer of the Post-it note

In 1968, Spencer Silver, a scientist at 3M in the United States, attempted to develop a super-strong adhesive. Instead, he accidentally created a "low-tack", reusable, pressure-sensitive adhesive for the aerospace industry. For five years, Silver promoted his "solution without a problem" within 3M both informally and through seminars, but failed to gain adherents. In 1974, a colleague who had attended one of his seminars, Arthur Fry, came up with the idea of using the adhesive to anchor his bookmark in his hymn book. Fry then utilized 3M's sanctioned "permitted bootlegging" policy, which allows employees to spend some of their work time on projects of their own choosing, to develop the idea. The original notes' canary yellow color was chosen by chance, from the color of the scrap paper available at the lab next door to the Post-it team. Fry provided 3M employees with a prototype of the product, and individuals started exchanging messages, demonstrating the product's communicative effectiveness.

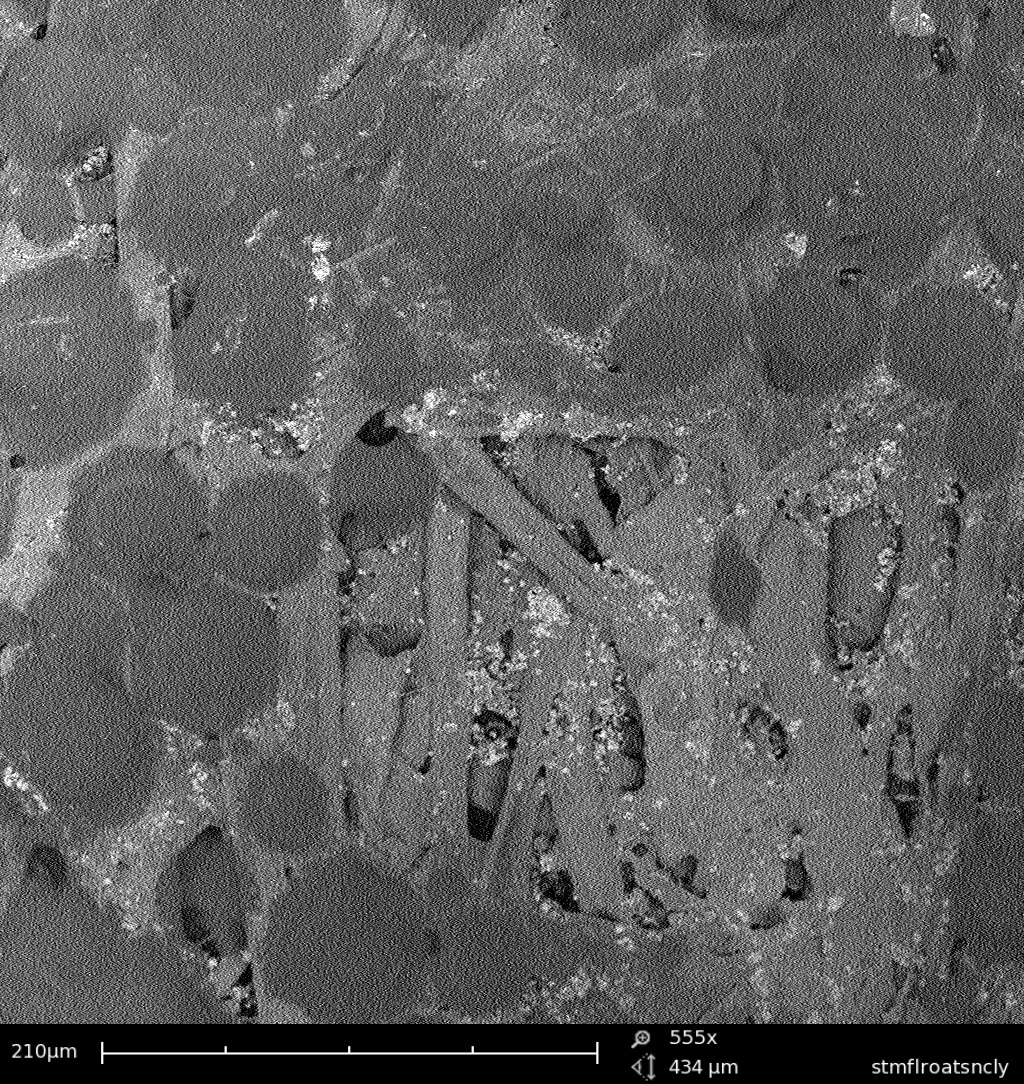
The adhesive side of a Post-it note, magnified 555 times with a scanning electron microscope

3M test marketed the product as a "Press 'n Peel" in stores in four cities in 1977, but results were disappointing. A year later, 3M launched a massive marketing campaign known as the Boise Blitz. This campaign involved renaming the product to "Post-it Note" and giving out free samples to offices in Boise, Idaho. This time, results were promising as more than 90 percent of those who received free samples indicated they would buy the product. Post-its were launched across the United States in 1980. The following year, they were launched in Canada and Europe. Post-it Notes as we know them were patented by Fry in 1993 as a "repositionable pressure-sensitive adhesive sheet material".

Post-it Flags were introduced as a new way to organize with color coding, filing, and indexing.

In 1995, Post-it Easel Pads were introduced. The following year, Post-it Easel Pads for kids were introduced.

In 2003, the company introduced Post-it Brand Super Sticky Notes, with a stronger glue that adheres better to vertical and non-smooth surfaces.

In 2014, 3M released Post-it Super Sticky Dry Erase Surface, an instant dry erase surface that is stain-free and customizable to quickly fit on walls, cabinets, desks and more.

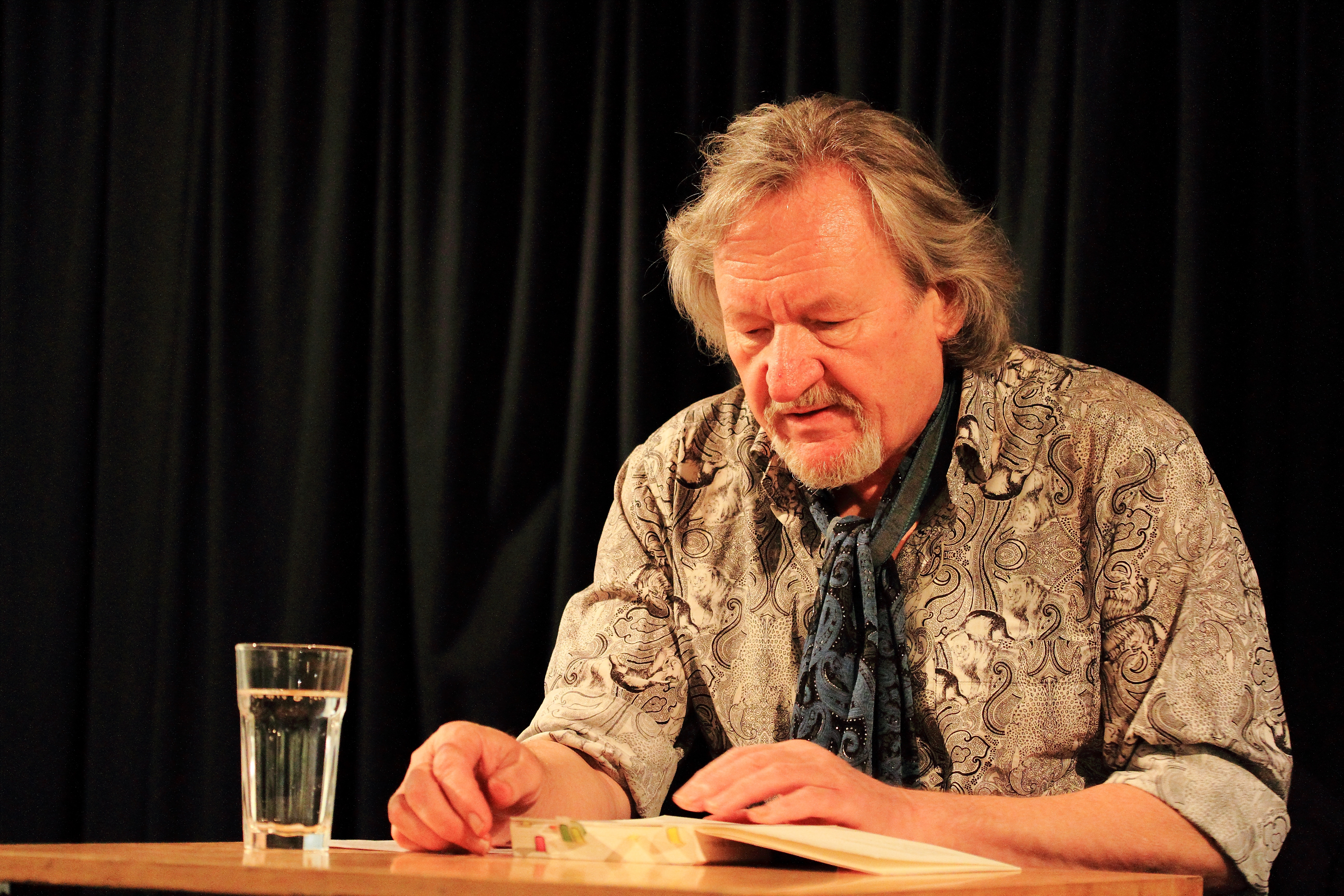
Klaus Theweleit reading from a book with post-it notes as bookmarks

In 2018, 3M launched Post-it Extreme Notes, which are more durable and water-resistant and which stick to wood and other materials in industrial environments.

In 2019, the Post-it App was relaunched.

In 2020, 3M released the Post-it Flex Write Surface – a whiteboard surface that can be written on with dry erase and permanent markers without leaving stains behind when cleaned with water and soap. The company also released Post-it Foil Tabs, which were a revamp of the Post-it Tab with the purpose of satisfying the rise of personalization and bullet journaling trends of customers.

In 2021, 3M revealed a new logo and launched Noted by Post-it Brand – a collection of paper goods and desktop applications.

The Post-it note is in the Architecture and Design collection of the Museum of Modern Art, and was included in Pirouette: Turning Points in Design, a 2025 exhibition featuring "widely recognized design icons [that highlight] pivotal moments in design history".

=== Awards and honors ===
The Post-it team received the internal 3M Golden Step Award in both 1981 and 1982 in recognition of their creation of a lucrative product that resulted in substantial new sales. Additionally, in 1981, they were honored with 3M's Outstanding New Product Award.

In 2010, the creators of the Post-it note joined the National Inventors Hall of Fame as a result of the widespread success of the Post-it note.

In 2019, the Post-it app was awarded 'Best of' App of 2019 by Google Play.

In 2021, the Post-it app won the Google Material Design Award within the motion category which awards apps that utilize unique design systems.

Silver and Fry both concluded their careers at 3M after achieving the highest accolades for their research and receiving numerous international engineering awards.

=== Competing claims ===
Alan Amron claimed to have been the actual inventor in 1973 and to have disclosed the Post-it note technology to 3M in 1974. His 1997 suit against 3M resulted in a confidential settlement. As part of the settlement, Amron agreed not to make future claims against the company unless the settlement agreement should be breached. However, in 2016, he launched a further suit against 3M, asserting that 3M was wrongly claiming to be the inventor, and seeking $400 million in damages. At a preliminary hearing, a federal judge ordered the parties to undergo mediation. The suit was subsequently dismissed, upholding the previous 1998 settlement.

In 1997, 3M sued Microsoft for trademark infringement for creating an electronic Post-it in Microsoft's Office 97 and using the term "Post-it" in a help file.

== Types ==
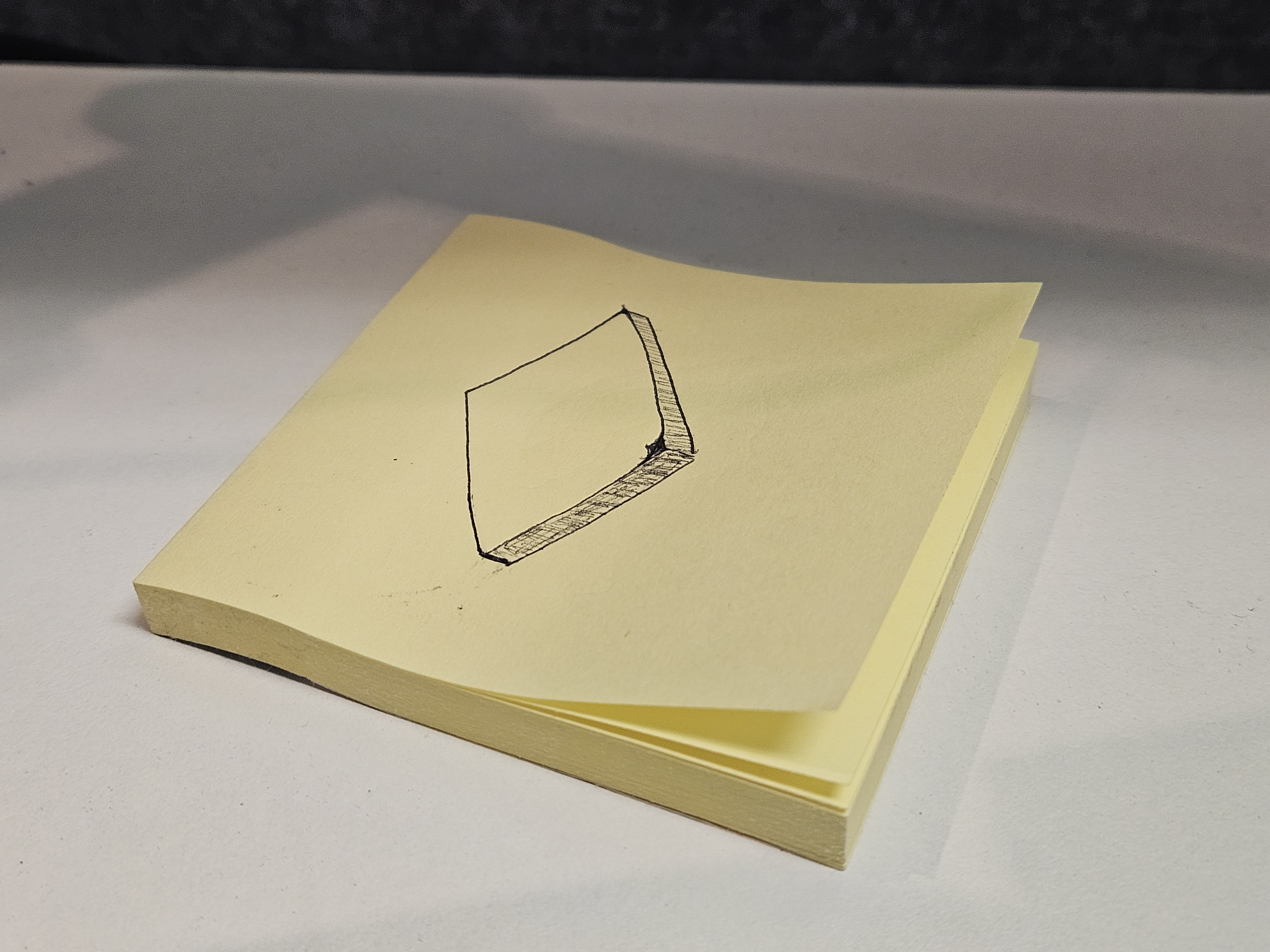
Illustration of yellow Post-It note pad on yellow Post-It note pad

Post-it notes come in a variety of colors, collections, sizes, and rulings. The original Post-it note color is Canary Yellow, the color of the notes when they were initially invented, and it remains one of the most popular colorways to this day. All the notes are recyclable, but 3M has also introduced Greener Post-It Notes, which feature a 67% plant-based adhesive and recycled paper that uses no new trees.

=== Colors ===
- White
- Black
- Gray
- Red: Candy Apple Red
- Pink: Positively Pink, Papaya Fizz, Power Pink, Tropical Pink, Guava
- Blue: Fresh Mint, Blue Paradise, Aqua Splash, Sea Glass, Washed Denim
- Yellow: Canary Yellow, Citron, Sunnyside
- Purple: Iris Infusion, Moonstone
- Green: Acid Lime, Lucky Green, Limeade
- Orange: Vital Orange, Neon Orange
- Transparent

=== Collections ===
- Beachside Café
- Oasis
- Summer Joy
- Simply Serene
- Supernova Neons
- Energy Boost
- Floral Fantasy
- Playful Primaries
- Wanderlust Pastels
- Poptimistic
- Sweet Sprinkles

=== Paper ruling ===
Post-it notes come in both lined and non-lined varieties, with the non-lined variant being the more common of the two.

=== Product variety ===
Varying types of Post-it notes are available on the market that vary in material, functionality, or stickiness. The currently available varieties are listed: Super Sticky Notes, Extreme Notes, Greener Notes, Cube Notes, Recycled Notes, Pop-Up Notes, Assorted Shapes and Size Notes, Notes with a Tab

=== Dimensions ===
The typical Post-it is 3 inches by 3 inches, but a variety of sizes are now offered. The currently available dimensions in inches include:1 3/8 x 1 7/8, 2 x 2, 2.8 x 2.8, 3 x 3, 3 x 5, 3.8 x 7.8, 3.9 x 2.9, 4 x 4, 4 x 6, 5 x 8, and 11 x 11.

=== Pads per pack ===
Post-its are sold in various quantities, ranging from smaller packs with 1 to 6 pads per pack and larger packs that contain from 12 to 36 pads per pack. The currently available quantities are listed: 1, 2, 3, 4, 5, 6, 12, 14, 18, 24, 27, and 36 pads/pack.

=== Sheets per pad ===
The number of sheets per pad also varies, with the typical pad containing 100 sheets. The available sheets per pad include: 30, 45, 50, 70, 75, 90, 100, and 400 sheets per pad.

== Uses ==
=== Workspaces and the classroom ===
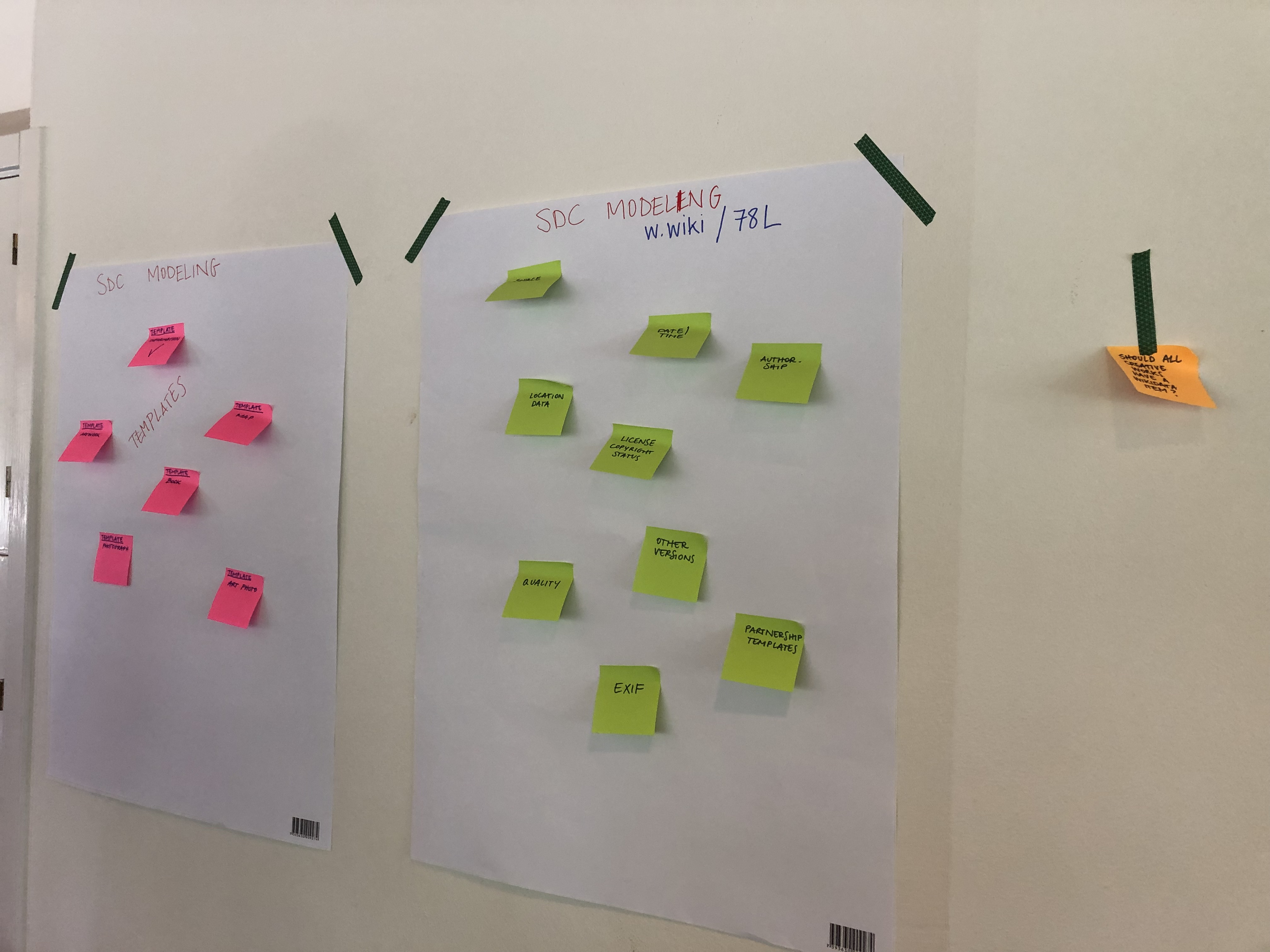
An example of Post-it note use in the workplace

Post-it notes can be used in design teams to offer up personal ideas, assist in group activities like brainstorming, and support design thinking and design outcomes.

They offer a wide variety of advantages in a classroom—for instance, they are cost efficient, don't take time to set up, and are simple enough to be used by almost any age group. They have uses in concept mapping, labeling models, and more. They can also be used when explaining and teaching about broader terms like genetics.

They are used in the workplace both to convey information and to offer praise or words of encouragement. They can help boost communication between coworkers and can help communications between departments. They can also serve to praise people or tell them to keep up the good work.

They can be used to annotate textbooks in place of standard highlighting and sideline note-taking methods, allowing the pages to remain free of markings. Additionally, Post-it notes can be used to visually guide students to important points in the textbook, helping them find information faster.

They are convenient for team exercises involving graphic organizers, such as a fishbone diagram. Students can easily collaborate on an organizer by each contributing one idea or clause on a Post-it.

=== Media ===
Post-its have appeared in a variety of movies and TV shows and are a widely used prop across different media channels. In Grey's Anatomy, the Post-it became an iconic symbol of commitment after Meredith and Derek used a blue Post-it to declare their wedding vows, a significant pop-culture moment. In season six of Sex and the City, the Post-it was used to facilitate a breakup.

Post-it notes have appeared in episodes of various TV shows, including The Office, Parks and Recreation, Being Mary Jane, and Doctor Who. Post-its have also appeared in films, including Bruce Almighty, Ex Machina, and Romy and Michele's High School Reunion.

=== Social media ===
On Instagram, the hashtag "#postitnotes" contains over 242,000 posts. The posts under this hashtag feature Post-its as art mediums, bookmarks, flipbooks, and more.

Due to its collaborative use in the workplace, Post-its are commonly seen in LinkedIn posts. One LinkedIn member posted about mapping the customer journey through Post-its with tips on involving different team members and organizational strategy.

=== Persuasion ===
Post-it notes may have a positive effect on how people interact with information presented to them. This is backed up by research that aimed to determine how attaching a blank Post-it note to a survey affected participation in the survey. The research found that the surveys with affixed Post-it notes were more likely to be completed and returned, and that the participants were more likely to write higher quality responses to the questions.

=== Art ===
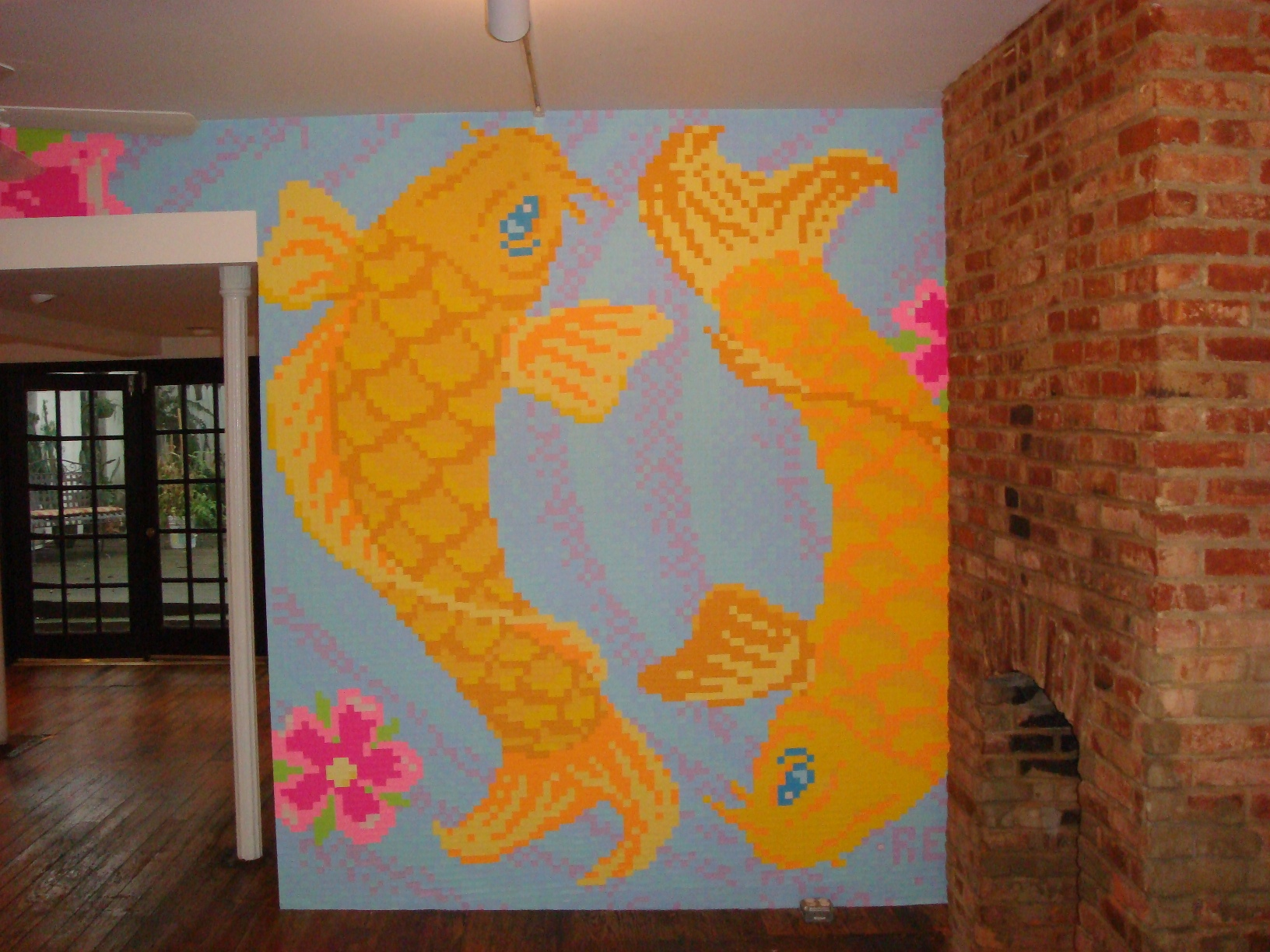
Post-it notes used to create a mosaic

"The Yellow Stickee Diary of a Mad Secretary", by Rosa Maria Arenas, is the mini graphic journal of an office worker/artist, exhibited July 7 through August 25, 2013, at the Michigan Institute of Contemporary Art (MICA) Gallery in Lansing, Michigan. The 41 drawings displayed are a tiny percentage of the more than 2000 original drawings that constitute the Yellow Stickee Diary Project which Arenas created while working temp jobs from 1994 to 2005. Printed with archival inks on archival paper, the reproductions include "stickee sized" (3″ × 5″) framed prints and enlargements of the original drawings (which were all done on Post-it notes).

In 2012, Turkish artist Ardan Özmenoğlu was selected to have a solo exhibition at Bertrand Delacroix Gallery in the art district of Chelsea, Manhattan. The exhibition, titled "E Pluribus Unum" (Latin for "Out of many, one"), opened November 15, 2012 and featured large scale works on Post-it notes.

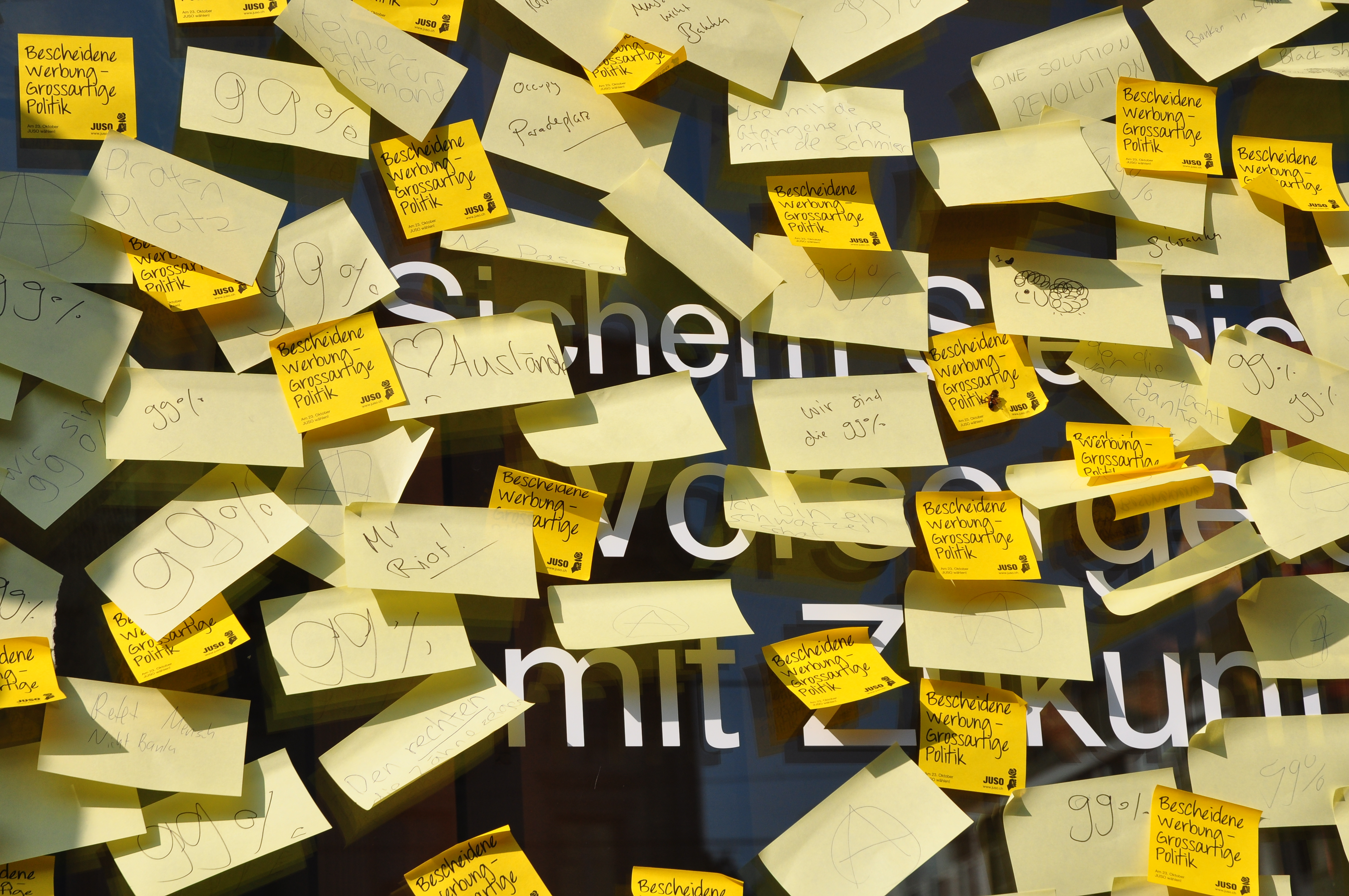
Occupy movement Post-it notes at the Paradeplatz in Zürich

In 2004, Paola Antonelli, a curator of architecture and design, included Post-it notes in a show entitled "Humble Masterpieces".

Rebecca Murtaugh, a California artist, who uses Post-it notes in her artwork, in 2001 created an installation by covering her whole bedroom with $1000 worth of the notes, using the ordinary yellow for objects she saw as having less value and neon colors for more important objects, such as the bed.

In 2000, the 20th anniversary of Post-it notes was celebrated by having artists create artworks on the notes. One such work, by the artist R. B. Kitaj, sold for £640 in an auction, making it the most valuable Post-it note on record.

The Lennon Wall, a message board created during the 2014 Hong Kong protests from a stretch of curved staircase in the Central Government Complex, is covered in multi-colored Post-it notes with handwritten messages from supporters.

In 2011, at the Munich, Germany Apple store, a group of Apple fans paid tribute to Steve Jobs by constructing a portrait of him out of 4001 Post-it notes. The use of Post-its resembled pixel art as each Post-it acted as a single pixel.

During the COVID-19 pandemic, artist Cauleen Smith created a video work featuring sticky notes called "Covid Manifesto". Smith used Instagram as a platform to engage with the social injustice posed by the pandemic. Covid Manifesto is part of an online exhibit at the Carnegie Museum of Art, which premiered on September 3, 2021.

=== Public engagement ===
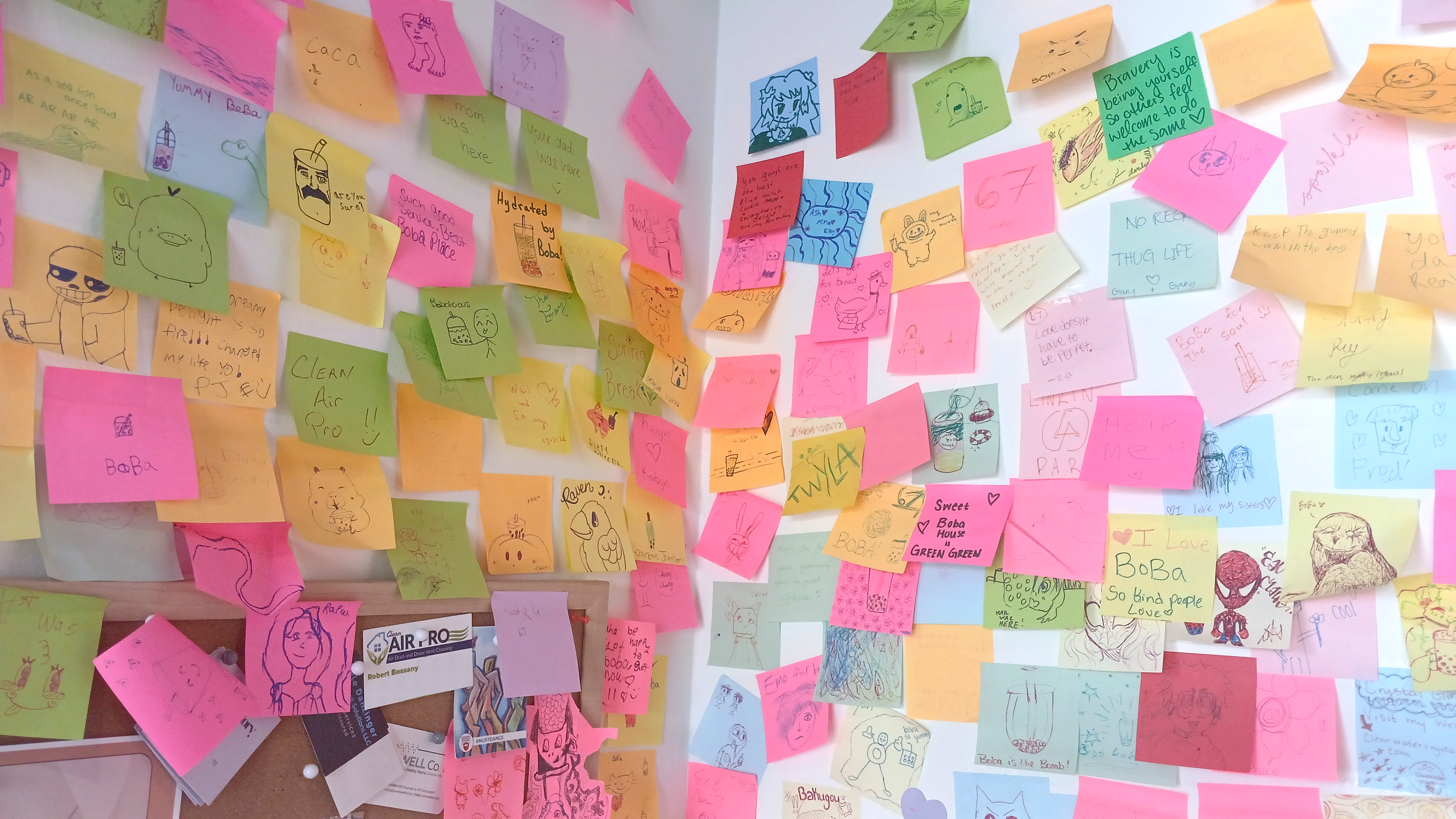
A wall full of doodles drawn on Post-it notes by the public

In 2016, the day after the US presidential election, artist Matthew "Levee" Chavez started a collaborative art project called "Subway Therapy". Levee set up tables and chairs in Union Square Station and invited commuters to express their thoughts and feelings on Post-it notes. Most Post-it notes conveyed people's hopes and fears in response to the election. The public contributed over 50,000 Post-it notes to the subway walls until the project was taken down on December 16, 2016. The New York Historical Society preserved several thousand of the Post-it notes.

Sidewalks Labs, a Google-owned company that focuses on urban innovation, opened a public workspace in Quayside, Toronto, that supports public engagement in the city-planning process. Plans are presented here and the public can freely share their ideas, opinions, and feedback on potential projects, often in the form of Post-it note annotations.

Post-it notes have also been used in museums to allow for more public interactivity and participation. In 2016, at the Minnesota History Center in Saint Paul, Minnesota, the public wrote their reflections on the life of Prince on Post-it notes and posted them near the exhibit. Some Post-it notes were archived by the museum to preserve the public sentiment expressed at the time.

== Software implementations ==
Virtual Post-it notes have been created for computers in the form of desktop notes. These include 3M's own Post-it Brand Software Notes, Stickies in macOS, and Sticky Notes in Windows.
