= ECybermission =

eCYBERMISSION is a U.S. Army-sponsored online educational science fair for students in grades 6–9 in the United States or at US Army schools across the world. The contest is conducted entirely online—groups of 2-4 students submit "Mission Folders", which contain detailed information about their projects choosing either Scientific Inquiry or the Engineering Design Process.

The competition selects winners on state, regional, and finally national levels for each grade level. All regional winners receive a trip to attend the National Judging and Educational Event (NJ&EE). Students can win up to $10,000 in savings bonds (maturity value). The NJ&EE event includes many opportunities to meet others, physical training, various workshops and panels, as well as the DoD STEM Workshops, which is a day working with scientists and engineers from different sectors of the DoD.

eCYBERMISSION is part of the Army Educational Outreach Program (AEOP).

The competition is administered by the National Science Teaching Association (NSTA).
