= Spencer Silver =

American chemist (1941–2021)

- Born: Spencer Ferguson Silver III; February 6, 1941; San Antonio, Texas, U.S.
- Died: May 8, 2021 (aged 80); Saint Paul, Minnesota, U.S.
- Education: Arizona State University; University of Colorado at Boulder
- Known for: Inventing adhesive for Post-it notes
- Scientific career
- Fields: Chemistry
- Workplaces: 3M
- Thesis: Acenaphthene epoxides and related derivatives (1966)
- Doctoral advisor: Henry J. Richter

Spencer Ferguson Silver III (February 6, 1941 – May 8, 2021) was an American chemist and inventor who specialized in adhesives. 3M credits him with having devised the adhesive that Arthur Fry used to create Post-it Notes.

== Early life ==
Spencer Ferguson Silver III was born in San Antonio, Texas, on February 6, 1941, to Bernice (née Wendt) and Spencer Silver Jr. His father was an accountant while his mother was a secretary. He majored in chemistry at Arizona State University, earning a B.S. in 1962, then earned a doctorate in organic chemistry from the University of Colorado at Boulder in 1966, before taking a position as a Senior Chemist in 3M's Central Research Labs.

== Career ==
Silver started his career at 3M's central research laboratory as a senior chemist focused on developing pressure sensitive adhesives. He started working in 1968 on trying to create a strong adhesive that could be used for aircraft construction. However, he failed in that objective and ended up developing a "low-tack" adhesive made of tiny acrylic spheres that would stick only where they were tangent to a given surface, rather than flat up against it. The adhesive's grip was strong enough to hold papers together, but weak enough to allow the papers to be pulled apart again without being torn. It could also be used again and again. The adhesive, acrylate copolymer microspheres, was patented in 1972 and described as suitable for use as a spray.

In 1974, Arthur Fry, a chemical engineer in the tape division at 3M, attended an internal seminar held by Silver, who was promoting his adhesive's properties. Fry regarded it as a potential solution to a practical challenge, that of preventing paper bookmarks from falling out of his hymnal when he sang in church. Fry developed bookmarks using Silver's adhesive, preventing them from leaving residue, and sought to interest others within the 3M company in them. The adhesive notes were initially marketed under the name Post 'n Peel in four cities from 1977 and as Post-it Notes from 1980 throughout the United States. Post-it as we know it was patented by Fry in 1993 as a "repositionable pressure-sensitive adhesive sheet material".

Silver worked for over 30 years at 3M rising to a position of a corporate scientist before retiring in 1996. Some of the other products that he worked on included block copolymers and immunodiagnostics. He is named in over 20 U.S. patents.

Silver received several awards for his work, including the 1998 American Chemical Society Award for Creative Invention and induction into the National Inventors Hall of Fame in 2011. A book of Post-it notes is held in the design collection of the Museum of Modern Art (MoMA) in New York City, and both Silver and Fry are credited as the artists.

In 2025, the Post-it Note was included in Pirouette: Turning Points in Design, an exhibition at the MoMA featuring "widely recognized design icons [...] highlighting pivotal moments in design history."

== Personal life ==
In 1965 Silver married Linda Martin, a computer programmer whom he met when she was an undergraduate working part time at the University of Colorado Boulder's chemistry department and he was pursuing his PhD at the same university. The couple went on to have two daughters, one of whom predeceased Silver in 2017.

Silver was a painter who pursued art seriously after his retirement, working on oils and pastels on canvas and acrylics to create abstract paintings.

Silver received a heart transplant in 1994. He died at his home in St. Paul, Minnesota, on May 8, 2021, from ventricular tachycardia. He was 80 years old.
