= Windows Live Home =

Microsoft web portal from 2005 to 2013

- Screenshot of Windows Live Home, which served as a central location to access all Windows Live services
- Website type: Software plus services (Web applications)
- Dissolved: August 2013
- Owner: Microsoft
- Website: www.live.com
- Commercial: No
- Registration: Required
- Users: 330 million
- Launched: November 1, 2005
- Current status: Closed
- Content license: Proprietary

Windows Live Home was a web portal launched by Microsoft as part of its Windows Live services. It aimed to bring many of the Windows Live services together in one place, by providing a central location to access Windows Live services and monitor status information.

== History ==
Windows Live Home was first revealed on August 3, 2007 at Microsoft Japan's annual Business Strategic Meeting 2008. It was expected that a new version of Live.com (later Windows Live Personalized Experience, now defunct) would be released in Fall 2007, featuring a new interface design together with Windows Live service integrations. Microsoft later confirmed that Windows Live Home would not be a replacement for Live.com.

Early prototype screenshot of Windows Live Home.

Some of the early announced features for Windows Live Home included:

- Providing access to emails and contacts through Hotmail
- Showing upcoming calendar items from Windows Live Calendar
- Allowing blog and photo publishing direct to Windows Live Spaces
- Showing the status of Windows Live OneCare installed on the PC

The final version of Windows Live Home was released on October 15, 2007. One notable feature of the first release of Windows Live Home was the ability to set the location of the user and display the current weather conditions for the city or region selected. The color of the homepage also automatically changed according to the time of the day.

Windows Live Home was updated on December 2, 2008 as part of the overall Windows Live Wave 3 update. In April 2010, live.com, the former address of Live Search, which had become Bing by then, started linking to Windows Live Home. The service was updated to "Wave 4" release on June 7, 2010.

In 2012, Microsoft began to phase out the Windows Live brand, and introduced Outlook.com as a future replacement for Hotmail. As Outlook.com sends users directly to their inbox when logging in, there is no equivalent of Windows Live Home. After the final Hotmail accounts were migrated to the new Outlook.com UI in May 2013, Windows Live Home ceased to exist.

== Features ==
Windows Live Home integrated tightly with other Windows Live services, serving as the entry point to many other services. These services featured the following:

- Ability to change the themes to be displayed on all Windows Live properties
- View the "Messenger social" feed for people in the user's network
- View recent activities for people in the user's network from Windows Live properties including Windows Live Profile, Windows Live Groups, SkyDrive, Windows Live Photos (later merged with OneDrive), and Windows Live Messenger
- View recent activities for people in the user's network from a range of third-party Services, such as Facebook, MySpace, and LinkedIn
- View "Hotmail highlights" information such as any unread messages, upcoming birthdays and Calendar events, flagged messages, or unread social network updates
- Update a user's personalized status message
- View MSN headlines
- View online Messenger contacts and chat with them using Web Messenger.
