= Redmi Note 8 =

Android smartphone made by Xiaomi

Xiaomi Redmi Note 8

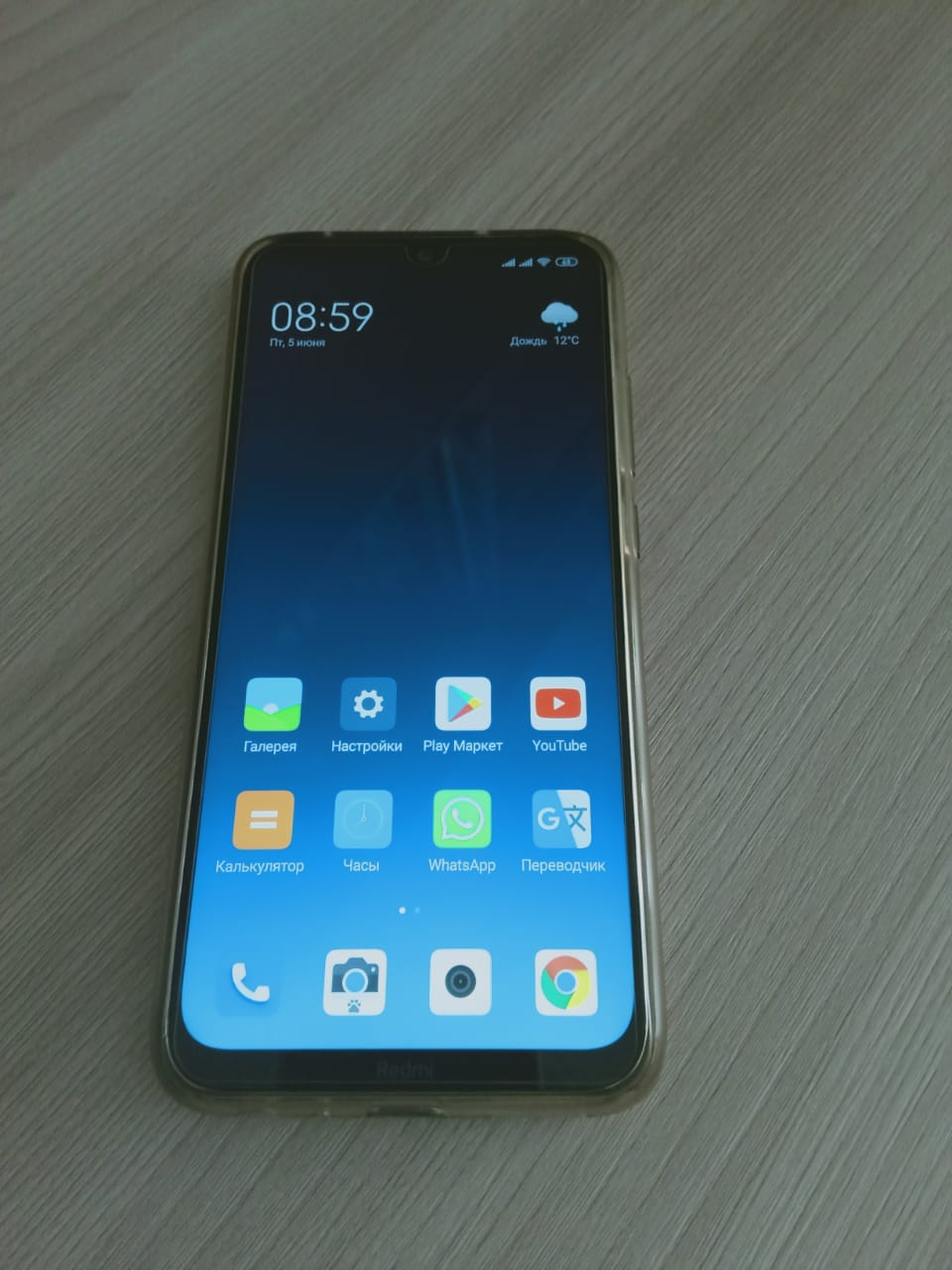
- Redmi Note 8
- Manufacturer: Xiaomi
- Type: Phablet
- Series: Redmi Note
- First released: Note 8/Pro: 29 August 2019; 6 years ago; Note 8T: 6 November 2019; 6 years ago; Note 8 2021: 24 May 2021; 5 years ago
- Units sold: 25 Million
- Predecessor: Redmi Note 7
- Successor: Redmi Note 9 Redmi Note 9 4G; Redmi Note 9 Pro 5G
- Compatible networks: 2G, 3G, 4G and 4G LTE
- Form factor: Slate
- Dimensions: Note 8/2021: 158.3 mm × 75.3 mm × 8.4 mm (6.23 in × 2.96 in × 0.33 in); Note 8T: 161.1 mm × 75.4 mm × 8.6 mm (6.34 in × 2.97 in × 0.34 in); Note 8 Pro: 161.3 mm × 76.4 mm × 8.8 mm (6.35 in × 3.01 in × 0.35 in)
- Weight: Note 8/2021: 190 g (6.7 oz); Note 8T: 200 g (7.1 oz); Note 8 Pro: 199 g (7.0 oz)
- Operating system: Note 8/Pro/8T: Original: MIUI 10 based on Android 9 Pie Current: MIUI 12.5 based on Android 11; Note 8 2021: Original: MIUI 12.5 based on Android 11 Current: MIUI 14 based on Android 13
- System-on-chip: Note 8/8T: Qualcomm Snapdragon 665; Note 8 Pro: MediaTek Helio G90T; Note 8 2021: MediaTek Helio G85
- CPU: Note 8/8T: Octa-core (4x 2.0 GHz Kryo 260 cores based on Cortex A73 + 4x 1.8 GHz Kryo 260 cores based on Cortex A53); Note 8 Pro: Octa-core (2x 2.05 GHz Cortex A76 + 6x 2.0 GHz Cortex A55); Note 8 2021: Octa-core (2x 2 GHz Cortex A75 + 6x 1.8 GHz Cortex A55)
- GPU: Note 8/8T: Adreno 610; Note 8 Pro: Mali G76 MC4 @ 800MHz; Note 8 2021: Mali G52 MC2 @ 1GHz
- Memory: LPDDR4X RAM: Note 8 : 3/4/6 GB; Note 8T/2021 : 3/4 GB; Note 8 Pro: 6/8 GB
- Storage: Note 8/8T: 32/64/128 GB; Note 8 Pro: 64/128/256 GB; UFS 2.1; Note 8 2021: 64/128 GB; eMMC 5.1
- Removable storage: microSDXC, expandable up to 256 GB (uses SIM 2 slot)
- Battery: Note 8/8T/2021: 4000 mAh; Note 8 Pro: 4500 mAh
- Charging: Fast charging 18W
- Rear camera: Note 8/8T/2021: Quad: Samsung ISOCELL Bright GM1/GM2 48MP (f/1.8, 0.8 μm) PDAF (wide) + 8 MP (f/2.2, 1.12 μm) 13mm (ultrawide) + 2 MP, f/2.4, 1/5", 1.75μm (dedicated macro camera) + 2 MP, f/2.4, 1/5", 1.75μm, depth sensor Note 8 Pro: Quad: Samsung ISOCELL Bright GW1 64MP (f/1.8, 0.8 μm) PDAF (wide) + 8 MP (f/2.2, 1.12 μm) 13mm (ultrawide) + 2 MP, f/2.4, 1/5", 1.75μm (dedicated macro camera) + 2 MP, f/2.4, 1/5", 1.75μm, depth sensor
- Front camera: Note 8/8T/2021: 13 MP, OmniVision 13855, LED flash, 1080p Note 8 Pro: 20 MP, LED flash, 1080p
- Display: Note 8/8T/2021: 6.3 inches (with up to 90% screen-to-body ratio); 2340 x 1080 pixels, 19.5:9 ratio (409 ppi); IPS LCD capacitive touchscreen, 16M colors Redmi Note 8 Pro: 6.53 inches (with up to 91.4% screen-to-body ratio); 2340 x 1080 pixels, 19.5:9 ratio (395 ppi); IPS LCD HDR capacitive touchscreen, 16M colors
- Connectivity: Bluetooth: Note 8/8T: Bluetooth 4.2; Note 8 Pro: Bluetooth 5.0; Note 8 2021: Bluetooth 5.2; Wi-Fi 802.11a/b/g/n/ac (2.4 & 5 GHz), dual-band, WiFi Direct, hotspot A2DP, LE
- Model: Note 8: M1908C3JG, M1908C3JH, M1908C3JI; Note 8 Pro: 2015105, M1906G7G, M1906G7I; Note 8T: M1908C3XG; Note 8 2021: M1908C3JGG
- Codename: Note 8: ginkgo; Note 8 Pro: begonia; Note 8 Pro (India): begoniain; Note 8T: willow; Note 8 2021: biloba
- Website: Xiaomi Malaysia Website

The Redmi Note 8 is the series of Android-based smartphones as part of the Redmi Note series by Redmi, a sub-brand of Xiaomi Inc. Redmi Note 8 and Note 8 Pro were released on 29 August 2019 in an event held in China. The Redmi Note 8 Pro is the first smartphone to be equipped with a 64-megapixel camera. The Note 8 Pro was released in Italy on 23 September 2019.

Later on November 6, 2019, Redmi Note 8T with NFC support, the absence of an LED indicator, and bigger bezels compared to the Redmi Note 8, was released. Also On May 24, 2021, the Redmi Note 8 2021 (sometimes is written as Redmi Note 8 (2021)), which has a CPU from the Redmi Note 9 and newer software version, was released.

The smartphone was succeeded by Redmi Note 9 Pro, with a significant upgrade in 2020.

The Redmi Note 8 has been removed from the Xiaomi website. It was replaced by Redmi Note 8T.

== Specifications ==
Variants	Redmi Note 8	Redmi Note 8T	Redmi Note 8 2021	Redmi Note 8 Pro
Processor	Qualcomm Snapdragon 665 AIE		MediaTek Helio G85	MediaTek Helio G90T
NFC	No	Yes	No	Yes
Battery
User-replaceable	No			
Battery type	Li-Po			
Battery capacity	4000 mAh			4500 mAh
Fast charging	18 W; Qualcomm Quick Charge 3.0; MediaTek Pump Express compatible			
Fast charging during screen-on	Yes			
Wireless charging	No			
Rear cameras
Photo	48 MP			64 MP
Video recording	4K@30fps 1080p60 fps 720p@30 fps		1080p@30 fps 720p@30 fps	4K@30fps 1080p@60 fps 720p@30 fps
Still photo during video recording	Same resolution as video frame			
Optical image stabilization	No			
Ultra-wide angle camera	8 MP			
Depth sensor camera	2 MP			
Macro camera	2 MP			
Front camera
Photo	13 MP			20 MP
Video recording	720p@30fps, 1080p@30/60fps, and 4K@30fps			

== Design ==
The Redmi Note 8 and Note 8 2021 measures 158.3 mm × 75.3 mm × 8.4 mm (6.23 in × 2.96 in × 0.33 in), for the Xiaomi Redmi Note 8T, measures 165.5 mm × 76.7 mm × 8.8 mm (6.52 in × 3.02 in × 0.35 in). Both of them weigh 209 grams (7.4 oz). Redmi Note 8, Note 8T and Note 8 2021 have flat back while Redmi Note 8 Pro has back with curved sides. The front and back are made of Gorilla Glass 5, and the frame is made of plastic. The bezels, which are always painted in black, are small (except the chin at the bottom), however, the phone does wobble because of a camera bump raising the phone. It is also splash-proof and has a P2i water-repellent coating. There is a back-mounted fingerprint sensor in this phone.

Preceded by Redmi Note 7	Redmi Note 8; 2019	Succeeded by Redmi Note 9
Preceded by Redmi Note 7	Redmi Note 8; 2019	Succeeded by Redmi Note 9 4G
Preceded by Redmi Note 7	Redmi Note 8; 2019	Succeeded by Redmi Note 9 5G
Preceded by Redmi Note 7	Redmi Note 8; 2019	Succeeded by Redmi Note 8 2021
Preceded by Redmi Note 8	Redmi Note 8 2021; 2021	Most recent
Preceded by Redmi Note 7 Pro	Redmi Note 8 Pro; 2019	Succeeded by Redmi Note 9 Pro
Preceded by Redmi Note 7 Pro	Redmi Note 8 Pro; 2019	Succeeded by Redmi Note 9 Pro 5G
First	Redmi Note 8T; 2019	Succeeded by Redmi Note 9T
