= Jumplist =

Internet Term

Jumplist was a term used in the early years of the World Wide Web to describe a collection of links, which were individually referred to as jumps. The Jumplist database-driven web service was developed by i/us Corp. and launched in 1998 at jumplist.com . It provided a highly-customizable method for users to create categorized collections of links, which they could access privately or display on their sites.

The service had both free and pay-for levels of service.

Nowadays, a jumplist is a GUI function in Windows operating systems (as of Windows 7) that displays context menus with recently used files or tasks on programme icons in the taskbar.
