= Microsoft Product Activation =

DRM mechanism used by Microsoft

The Activation Wizard in Windows XP

Microsoft Product Activation is a DRM technology used by Microsoft in several of its computer software programs, most notably its Windows operating system and its Office productivity suite. The procedure enforces compliance with the program's end-user license agreement by transmitting information about both the product key used to install the program and the user's computer hardware to Microsoft, inhibiting or completely preventing the use of the program until the validity of its license is confirmed.

The procedure has been met with significant criticism by many consumers, technical analysts and computer experts, who argue that it is poorly designed, highly inconvenient and ultimately does nothing to prevent software piracy. The process has been successfully circumvented on multiple occasions.

This technology is also used in Microsoft Office products during activation. To activate volume-licensed versions of Office, including Project and Visio, one must have a Key Management Service (KMS) host computer. One can configure a Windows Server computer to be a KMS host computer by installing the Volume Activation Services role and then running the Volume Activation Tools wizard.

== Process ==
=== Before activation ===
The Activation Wizard in Office 2010

When installing a retail copy of Windows or Office, the user is asked to input a unique product key supplied on a certificate of authenticity included with the program, which is later verified during activation. Immediate activation is not required following installation, but the program must be activated within a specific period of time in order to continue to function properly. Throughout this grace period, the user will be periodically reminded to activate the program, with warnings becoming more frequent over time.

Certain versions of Windows and Office are available under a volume license, where a single product key is used for multiple installations. Programs purchased under this license must still be activated, with the exception of Windows XP and all versions of Office released prior to Office 2010. Businesses using this licensing system have the option of using Microsoft's activation servers or creating and managing their own.

If Windows is pre-installed on a computer by an original equipment manufacturer (OEM), the operating system is automatically activated without the need for interaction from the user. In this case, the copy of Windows installed does not use the product key listed on the certificate of authenticity, but rather a master product key issued to OEMs called a System Locked Pre-installation (SLP) key. On each boot, Windows confirms the presence of specific information stored in the BIOS by the manufacturer, ensuring the activation only remains valid on that computer, even if the product key is used on another machine.

=== After grace period ===
If activation is not performed within the grace period, or fails because of an illegal or invalid product key, then the following restrictions will be imposed on the user:

- In Windows XP, Windows Server 2003, and Windows Server 2003 R2, after a grace period of 30 days, the operating system cannot be used at all until the activation process is completed successfully.
- In Windows Vista RTM, after a grace period of 30 days, the operating system will boot only into a reduced functionality mode. The reduced functionality varies based on whether the operating system is simply out of grace or has undergone a failed activation. In the former case, built-in games and premium features like Windows Aero are disabled, and the system is rebooted every hour; in the latter case, certain premium features are disabled and some content is not available from Windows Update.
- In Windows Vista SP1, Windows Vista SP2, Windows 7, Windows Server 2008, and Windows Server 2008 R2, after a grace period of 30 days (60 days for Windows Server 2008), the operating system will display a notice in the bottom right of the desktop stating that the copy of Windows is not genuine, and set the desktop background to black. This includes allowing only critical and security updates to be downloaded from Windows Update and giving periodic reminders to activate the operating system. However, the operating system otherwise functions normally.
- In Windows 8, Windows 8.1, Windows 10, Windows 11, Windows Server 2012, Windows Server 2012 R2, and Windows Server 2016 and later, the 30-day grace period has been removed. If the operating system is not activated, there is a watermark showing the edition of Windows or a message telling the user to activate Windows on desktop. Personalization features such as changing the wallpaper are disabled. In Windows 8 and 8.1, the ability to change the desktop wallpaper is still possible, however changing the Start screen color & design and lock screen wallpaper are disabled. Notifications also appear occasionally telling the user to activate. However, the operating system otherwise functions normally.
- In Office XP, Office 2003, Office 2007, Office 2010, and Office 2013 and later, after a grace period of;
  - 30–60 days for Office 2010,
  - 14–60 days in Office 2013,
  - opening the program 25 times for Office 2007,
  - opening the program 50 times for Office 2003 and XP,
  - or opening the program 10 times for Visio 2002,

the programs will enter a reduced functionality mode, where files can be viewed but not edited.

When activation takes place, the program saves a record of the verification data in the user's computer. If the system is booted up with significant hardware changes, the application will likely require reactivation to prevent the same copy of the program being installed on two different systems.

On Windows 10 and Windows 11, the activation process can also generate a "digital entitlement", which allows the operating system's hardware and license status to be saved to the activation servers, so that the operating system's license can automatically be restored after a clean installation without the need to enter a product key. Newer builds of Windows allow such licenses to be linked to a user’s Microsoft account. A maximum of 10 retail transferable digital licenses can be linked to a single Microsoft account. OEM digital licenses are not transferable and therefore do not count against this limit.

=== During activation ===
Activation is performed with a utility supplied with Windows and Office called the Activation Wizard. It can be performed either over the Internet or by telephone. When activating over the Internet, the Activation Wizard automatically transmits and receives verification data to and from Microsoft servers, completing the process without any interaction by the user. Activation by telephone requires that a user and a Microsoft agent verbally exchange activation information. In this case, an installation ID is generated, which is then read to the agent. The agent verifies the information and replies with a confirmation ID, which is then typed into the Activation Wizard.

The Activation Wizard generates verification data primarily based on information about hardware in the computer. In Windows XP, information about the following ten categories of hardware is included:

- Graphics card
- Hard disk drive
- System partition volume serial number
- IDE adapter
- Network interface controller MAC address
- Optical disc drive (e.g. DVD-ROM)
- Processor type
- Central processing unit serial number
- RAM amount range (e.g. 0-512 MB)
- SCSI adapter

Every time a PC is booted, Windows XP checks the hardware configuration against that which existed at the time of installation. From the above list, six or more items must change for the reactivation to be required. The position is complicated in that the network card MAC address is regarded as three items. Therefore, if the network card is not changed, a change to six or more other items will trigger a reactivation. If the network card is changed, then just three other changes will trigger a reactivation.

PCs that are considered dockable are treated more leniently as hardware will, by definition, regularly change. A dockable PC is one that is equipped with a docking port that connects to an expansion unit that features extra ports or hardware (these are usually ancillary units custom designed for some laptop PCs). A dockable PC is allowed three extra changes beyond a non-dockable PC before reactivation is required.

The verification data is also based on the product key entered during activation. In some cases, the product key is checked against a list of known illegally distributed keys.

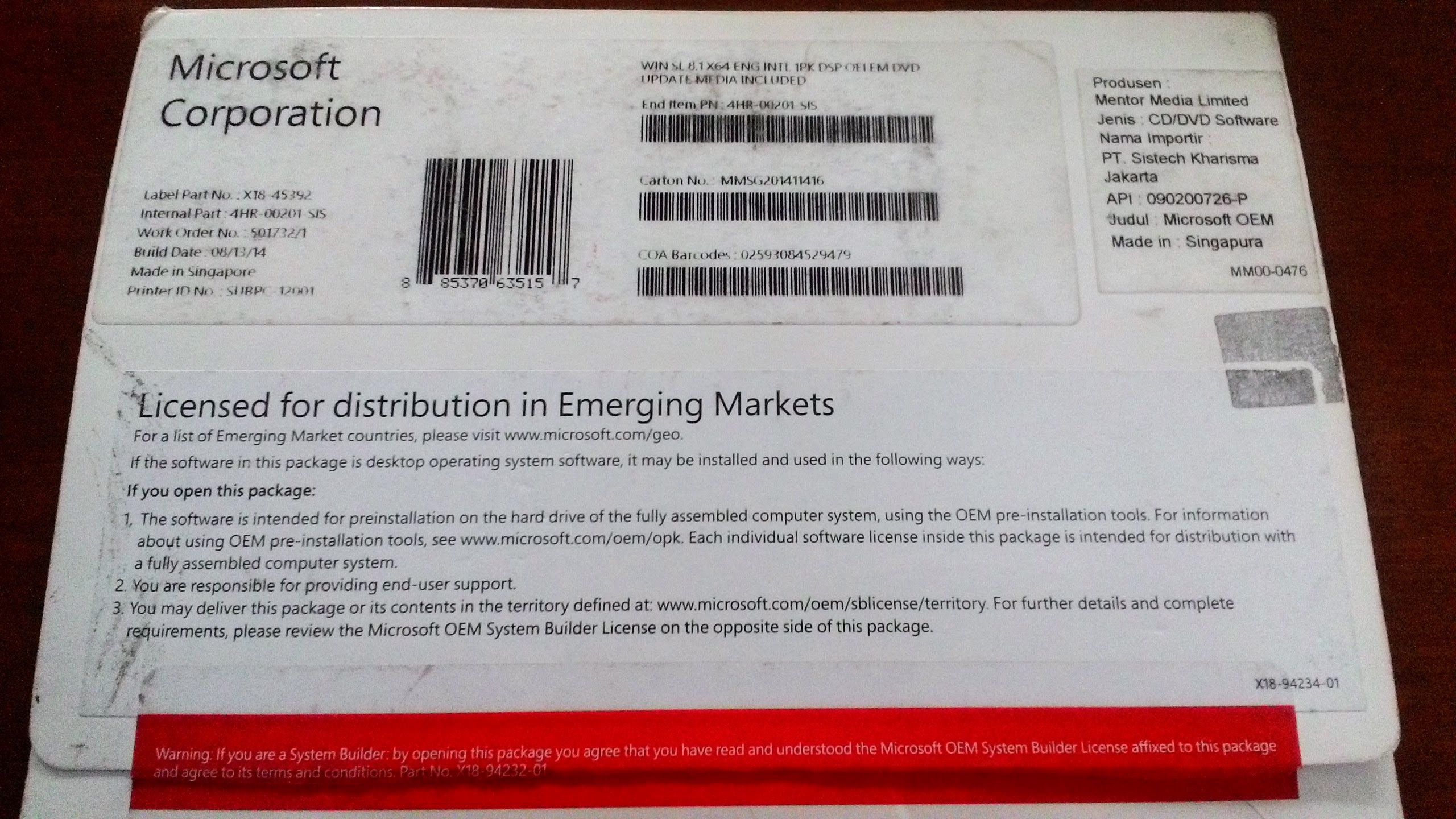
Emerging Markets licensed OEM installer DVD for Windows 8.1 Single Language (South East Asia)

Certain retail and OEM copies of Windows and Office sold in certain countries classified as emerging markets have geographical activation restrictions, which only allow the user to activate the product within the indicated region.

In Windows 7 and later, significant hardware changes (e.g. motherboard) may require a re-activation.

In Windows 10 and 11, a user can run the Activation Troubleshooter if the user has changed hardware on their device recently. If the hardware has changed again after activation, they must wait 30 days before running the troubleshooter again.

=== After activation ===
If activation completes successfully, the user can continue to use the application without any further issues or impediments. Also, if the key gets blacklisted, the application will continue to run as normal unless a clean install and activation is performed after its key has been blacklisted.

== Usage ==
The following tables illustrate the usage of product activation throughout Microsoft software, specifying whether the programs can be equipped with retail or volume licensing activation as well as geographical activation restrictions.

=== Windows ===
	Retail activation	Volume licensing activation	Geographical activation restrictions
Windows XP	Yes	No	Yes
Windows Server 2003	Yes	No	No
Windows Vista	Yes	Yes	Yes
Windows Server 2008	Yes	Yes	No
Windows 7	Yes	Yes	Yes
Windows Server 2008 R2	Yes	Yes	No
Windows 8	Yes	Yes	Yes
Windows Server 2012	Yes	Yes	No
Windows 8.1	Yes	Yes	Yes
Windows Server 2012 R2	Yes	Yes	No
Windows 10	Yes	Yes	Yes
Windows Server 2016	Yes	Yes	No
Windows Server 2019	Yes	Yes	No
Windows Server 2022	Yes	Yes	No
Windows 11	Yes	Yes	Yes

=== Office ===
	Retail activation	Volume licensing activation	Geographical activation restrictions
Office XP	Yes	No	No
Office 2003	Yes	No	No
Office 2007	Yes	No	No
Office 2010	Yes	Yes	Yes
Office 2013	Yes	Yes	Yes
Office 2016*	Yes	Yes	Yes
Office 2019*	Yes	Yes	Yes
Office 2021*	Yes	Yes	Yes
Office 2024*	Yes	Yes	Yes

*All Office 2016+ and Microsoft 365 (formerly Office 365) licenses are associated with an email account. A personal licence is re-activated on a new machine by logging in to office.com and selecting which of their machines to associate.

== Criticism ==
While Microsoft says that product activation benefits consumers by allowing Microsoft to produce higher quality software, it has nevertheless received much criticism regarding its design and implementation, effectiveness at stopping piracy and respect of privacy rights. For instance, during the development of Windows XP, beta testers strongly criticized the introduction of product activation, particularly because a change in computer hardware required re-activation. Ken Fischer at Ars Technica questioned whether activation would ultimately be effective in stopping piracy, stating that while casual computer users would be affected, he would "be a fool to think that someone out there won't find a way to break this whole thing." Dave Wilson, a technology columnist at the Los Angeles Times, describes activation as "just another example of a rapacious monopolist abusing computer users who are helpless to do anything about it." He too believed that the system would not have "any significant effect on professional pirates." Fred Langa at InformationWeek, with reference to the transmission of hardware information during activation, stated that "many users are incensed at this level of monitoring, intrusion, and control by Microsoft." Finally, Dr. Cyrus Peikari and Seth Fogie, security consultants, considered product activation to be "hostile both to privacy and to human dignity."

Others defend Microsoft's use of product activation. The Harrison Group, a market research firm, conducted a study sponsored by Microsoft in 2011 illustrating that computers running activated versions of Windows software were on average 50% faster than their pirated counterparts. The group concluded by stating that users of genuine Microsoft products ultimately receive superior performance while counterfeit users are susceptible to security issues and lost productivity. Fully Licensed GmbH, a developer of digital rights management technology, while criticizing Microsoft for being vague about the nature of information sent from a given computer during activation, nevertheless concluded that activation is not particularly intrusive and does not significantly violate privacy.

Microsoft Product Activation has also been criticized on multiple occasions for violating patent law. In 2006, Microsoft was required to pay $142 million to z4 Technologies for infringing on a product activation patent, while in 2009 Microsoft was ordered to pay $388 million to Uniloc for patent infringement in product activation in Windows XP, Office XP and Windows Server 2003.

== Circumvention ==
Microsoft Product Activation has been cracked or circumvented on numerous occasions since it was introduced in 2001. In 2001, a UK security company called Bit Arts successfully managed to bypass product activation on Windows XP, while in 2003, volume license keys for Windows XP were leaked to the public, allowing users who had not purchased a volume license to the operating system to bypass activation. In 2009, several security flaws in Windows 7 were used by hackers to circumvent activation.

Since the introduction of Windows Vista, most attempts at circumvention of product activation have focused on using leaked SLP product keys and BIOS information used by OEMs to preactivate Windows. In 2007, a circumvention measure was developed for Windows Vista by warez-group Paradox that simulates the BIOS, allowing leaked SLP information to be fed to the operating system, bypassing activation. In 2009, SLP product keys and certificate information for Windows 7 were leaked to the public, allowing the BIOS to be reconfigured to bypass activation.

== List of Microsoft products with product activation ==
The following Microsoft products other than Windows, Windows Server or products from the Office family use activation:

- Age of Empires III
- AutoCollage 2008
- Microsoft AutoRoute
- Microsoft Expression Studio 3 and 4 (retail versions other than DreamSpark or volume licensed version)
- Microsoft Flight Simulator X
- Microsoft MapPoint 2009 and later retail versions. Not for volume licensed version.
- Microsoft Math Solver 3.0
- Microsoft Money 2007 and later
- Microsoft Plus! Digital Media Edition
- Microsoft Research Songsmith
- Microsoft Streets & Trips 2008 and later
- Zoo Tycoon 2

== See also ==
- Digital rights management
- Product activation
- Product key
- Regional lockout
- Software protection dongle
- Technical support
- Uniloc USA, Inc. v. Microsoft Corp.
- Windows Genuine Advantage
