= LM-X License Manager =

- Developer(s): X-Formation
- Operating system: Windows, Linux
- Platform: Cross-platform
- Available in: English
- Type: Software license management
- License: Proprietary
- Website: www.x-formation.com/lm-x-license-manager

The LM-X License Manager is a license management tool that protects software products against piracy. It is used by Independent Software Vendors (ISV) to implement some of the Software Asset Management practices. related to monitoring of the usage of existing applications and adding new licenses wherever requested by end-. ISV can control their license policies externally from applications, and enforce various levels of security.

LM-X software license manager can be run on a number of platforms including Windows, Linux, and Mac OS X.

== Features ==
- System Clock Check
- Automatic Server Discovery
- Manual and automatic heartbeats
- License Borrowing and Grace Licensing
- Pay Per Use
- License Replacement
- Web-based License Management

== See also ==
- Copy protection
- Digital rights management
- Floating licensing
- License borrowing
- List of license managers
- Product activation
