= FlexNet Publisher =

Software license manager

- Original authors: GLOBEtrotter and Highland
- Developer: Flexera Software
- Release: 1988; 38 years ago
- Stable release: 2026 R1 SP1 (11.19.10.0) / March 30, 2026; 7 months ago
- Written in: C/C++, Java
- Operating system: Windows, macOS, Linux, and various UNIXes
- Platform: Cross-platform
- Available in: English
- Type: Software license management
- License: Proprietary
- Website: www.flexera.com/producer/products/software-monetization/flexnet-licensing/flexnet-publisher/

FlexNet Publisher (formerly known as FLEXlm) is a software license manager from Flexera Software which implements license management and is intended to be used in corporate environments to provide floating licenses to multiple end users of computer software.

Computer software can be licensed in a variety of ways. A license to use a piece of software may be associated with a specific machine (node-locked), permitting it to only run on that machine (node in a network). Alternatively, a company may buy a pool of floating licenses and these licenses may be allocated dynamically to machines, a license being checked-out when a user begins using the software on any given machine and checked-in when the user finishes using the software. In this way, for example, a company might buy a pool of 50 licenses but support a user community of hundreds of occasional users of the software (so long as no more than 50 users ever want to use the software simultaneously).

== History ==
FLEXlm was originally a joint development by GLOBEtrotter Software and Highland Software in 1988. Highland Software's Scott Holmgren and Robert Hartman, partnered in rolling out this new method for software licensing in Silicon Valley, California. With Hartman's role as VP of Sales and Business Development, sales efforts quickly gained traction and early adoption for pioneering this software method to embed FLEXlm software into several hundred of Silicon Valley's leading software company's products including, Sun Systems, Symantec, and Reed Hastings and Tom Siebel's early software tech companies. FLEXlm quickly became recognized as the software industry's de facto standard globally for license manager software. Subsequently, Highland's rights to the FLEXlm product were acquired by GLOBEtrotter in 1994; Highland continued as a reseller of 3rd party software. GLOBEtrotter was then acquired by Macrovision in 2000. Combining features from the Safecast protection system and FLEXlm, FlexNet featured product activation and executable wrapping, supporting floating licensing and node locked licensing models. Macrovision subsequently renamed FLEXlm to FLEXnet Publisher.

The original FLEXlm development team moved on to develop the Reprise License Manager (RLM) at Reprise Software in 2006.

On 1 April 2008 Macrovision's Software Business Unit, which included FLEXnet Publisher, was sold to the private equity company Thoma Cressey Bravo and subsequently relaunched as Acresso Software. It was a cash transaction valued at approximately $200 million.

In October 2009 Acresso Software announced its name change to Flexera Software and FLEXnet Publisher was changed to FlexNet Publisher.

A July 2011 announcement said that Teachers' Private Capital, the private investment department of the Ontario Teachers' Pension Plan, had agreed to acquire a majority stake in Flexera Software from Thoma Bravo, LLC, a private equity firm.

In 2020, Flexera Software rebranded its supplier division as Revenera, which currently markets the product as FlexNet Publisher.

== Issues with bootloaders ==
Due to the way the digital rights management (DRM) works in FlexNet Publisher, FlexNet affects bootloaders; this makes FlexNet Publisher incompatible with drives encrypted with TrueCrypt and renders Linux-based systems unable to boot. The TrueCrypt developers also state that "the issue is caused by inappropriate design of the third-party activation software."

== Other license management software ==
- 10Duke
- LicenseSpring
- IBM LUM
- LM-X License Manager
- OpenLM
- PACE Anti-Piracy
- Reprise License Manager (RLM)
- Wibu-Systems
- Windows Genuine Advantage
