= Bsquare =

- Company type: Public
- Traded as: Nasdaq: BSQR (prior to 2023)
- Industry: Technology
- Founded: 1994; 32 years ago
- Founders: William Baxter; Elizabeth Baxter
- Defunct: 2023; 3 years ago
- Fate: Acquired by Kontron
- Headquarters: Seattle, Washington, United States
- Key people: Ralph Derrickson (CEO); Cheryl Wynne (CFO)
- Brands: SquareOne
- Number of employees: 250 (2015)
- Website: https://www.bsquare.com/

Bsquare was an Internet of Things (IoT) systems software provider, technology distributor, and system integrator headquartered in Seattle, Washington, It supported OEMs, ODMs, and enterprises with OS licenses, device management, and professional development services.

As of 2015, the company had approximately 250 employees worldwide. In 2023, the company was delisted from Nasdaq as Bsquare after being acquired by Kontron.

== History ==
Founded in 1994 by William and Elizabeth Baxter, it was listed on the Nasdaq stock exchange.

In 2008, Bsquare acquired TestQuest, expanding the company's testing automation capabilities. Three years later, it purchased British-based company MPC Data Limited, expanding into the software sector in the United Kingdom and Europe.

On December 6, 2023, it was announced that Kontron America completed the acquisition of a majority stake (82.69%) in the Seattle, Washington-based firm.

== Industry services and products ==
Bsquare provided B2B technology products and services. Their primary focus was SquareOne, a device management suite of software and services that supports intelligent IoT operations. It is also an AWS Technology Partner and utilises AWS services alongside services developed in-house.

Bsquare also provided hardware engineering, platform software development, application development, quality assurance and testing, licensing services, training and support. Supported operating systems include Android, iOS, Linux and Windows IoT.

== Global locations ==
Geographies	Office
North America	Seattle, Washington, United States (Corporate Headquarters)
Europe	Trowbridge, Wiltshire, United Kingdom
