= Node-locked licensing =

Node-locked licensing, also known as a single use license, device license, named host license, or machine-based license, is a software licensing approach in which a license for a software application is assigned to one or more hardware devices (specific nodes, such as a computer, mobile devices, or IoT device). Typically any numbers of instances are allowed to execute for such license.

This form of licensing is used by software publishers to ensure the license is only run on particular hardware devices.

Every node is identified by a unique hardware ID (device fingerprint) which needs to be obtained or entered during the pairing process (usually product setup or first license validation).

== See also ==
- Software metering
- License manager
- License borrowing
- Floating licensing
