= Remote Graphics Software =

Remote desktop software

HP Z Remote Graphics Software (RGS)
- Developer: HP Inc.
- Stable release: 26.08 / August 2026; 2 months ago
- Operating system: Red Hat Enterprise Linux, SUSE Linux Enterprise Desktop, Windows 10, Windows 11 and for the RGS receiver HP ThinPro, and macOS
- Type: Remote desktop software (client software and server software)
- License: Proprietary
- Website: www.hp.com/rgs

HP Z Remote Graphics Software (RGS), temporarily known as HP ZCentral Remote Boost, is a client-server remote desktop software developed by HP Inc. for workstation power users doing CAD, VFX, and other high end visualization applications. It was first launched in 2003.

HP RGS enables remote access to workstations (or virtual workstations) from many different devices, including other workstations and thin-clients. HP RGS was designed for industries where true color accuracy is critical, and was the first remote display protocol to offer full 4:4:4 color in the days before chroma subsampling was a thing and professional CRT monitors provided full RGB color.

HP RGS enables remote work and hybrid work where data can stay on site, but engineers and artists can work from anywhere. It also enables real-time collaborative screen sharing between multiple users, and multiple operating systems such as Windows, Linux and MacOS.

The remote desktop tool is optimized to provide low latency interactions, even with poor network conditions such as packet loss.

In 2020, HP rebranded RGS to HP ZCentral Remote Boost as part of the HP ZCentral racked workstation solution. ZCentral Remote Boost was awarded an Engineering Emmy Award in 2020.

HP RGS processing and hardware-accelerated graphics are done on the workstation and only compressed bitmap images (the screen) are sent to the client device.

There are two components to the software, the sender (for the workstation or server) and the receiver (for the client device). The software supports OpenGL and Microsoft DirectX. The software is sold for access to workstations, GPU servers, and virtual machines. HP included HP RGS with its Z workstations from version 5.4.7 in 2011 to version 20.4 in 2022. HP RGS can be downloaded from HP.com/go/rgs. The current version requires a license.

An early version of the HP RGS video compression codec, is derived from a patented system developed by HP Labs and used in the NASA Mars rover program.

HP acquired a competing remote desktop tool called Teradici PCoIP in 2021 and then named that tool HP Anyware with a focus on accessing Cloud PCs. In 2026, HP announced the end of life of HP Anyware and HP directed customers to migrate to HP RGS as the remote access tool of choice for professionals in engineering, design, VFX, media, and other high end compute markets.

== Versions ==
From HP RGS' release notes website.

Date	Version	Features and Fixes Added
August 2026	RGS 26.08	Added end user quality slider to RGS toolbar; Improved UI and descriptions of Video Codec options; Addressed black screen issues with RHEL/Rocky/Alma 9.8
June 2026	RGS 26.06	EDID Remoting: New experimental feature to allow remoting of the EDIDs from the Receiver to the Sender machine.; Added the ability to check license status and activate a new license from the Sender GUI.; Improved the experience of headless Windows Senders running Nvidia Professional graphics.; Addressed an issue where Sender license registration failed when the machine had been licensed to a prior account.; Addressed an issue where Windows Senders on VMs would perform poorly if there was no GPU; Addressed an issue where the Receiver could flicker rapidly when the resolution or layout on the Sender changes.; Addressed an issue where the resolution and layout matching could fail with certain monitors.; Addressed an issue where a cached image from a previous connection could be seen briefly if the receiver program had not be restarted between connections.; Addressed an issue on Rocky 9 where the Receiver could crash during resolution matching.; Addressed an issue on RHEL/Rocky/Alma 9.8 where the sender would fail to transition from logged out to logged in state.; Addressed an issue where Windows Single Sign-On (SSO) could fail periodically.; Known Issue: The Sender and Receiver installers can be affected by a new Windows feature called Smart App Control. This can cause the installers to run extremely slowly, and/or fail. Suggestion is to disable Smart App Control.
April 2026	RGS 26.02.1	The Sender install now installs the HP VMouse by default. This addresses an issue where the cursor might not show up on a Sender that doesn’t have a physical mouse attached.; Added a Receiver side property to allow an administrator to set the Remote Computer input box to read-only.; Added a Sender side property to control whether license expiration notification messages are displayed; Addressed an issue where the feedback button was not appearing on the Receiver.; Various other fixes with widescreen displays, cursor position, AVC mode and Windows ARM systems.; Known Issue: The Sender and Receiver installers can be affected by a new Windows feature called Smart App Control. This can cause the installers to run extremely slowly, and/or fail. Suggestion is to disable Smart App Control.; Known Issue: Machines previously associated with an Anyware licenses can fail to recognize new HP RGS licenses. Contact HP support for a fix if this occurs.
February 2026	RGS 26.02	HP ZCentral Remote Boost is renamed back to HP Z Remote Graphics Software (RGS).; HP RGS has new license options for when purchased separately from HP Anyware Pro. HP RGS continues to be able to use HP Anyware Pro licenses from the Cloud License Service or Local License Server.; Added support for Windows 11 25H2; Added Receiver support for macOS 26 Tahoe
November 2024	Remote Boost 2022.1.2	Added support for Windows 11 24H2, Ubuntu 24.04, Receiver support for macOS 14 Sonoma, and macOS 15 Sequoia. Various Defect Fixes.
November 2022	Remote Boost 2022.1.1	Added support for more widescreen displays when using resolution and layout matching. Added support for Windows 10 22H2, 11 22H2, RHEL 9, Ubuntu 22.04. Added Receiver support for macOS 13 Ventura.
March 2022	Remote Boost 2022.1	In app product feedback link added to receiver. New sender property for 3Dconnexion devices to disable input blocking when screen blanking is enabled.
December 2021	Remote Boost 2022	Remote Boost (RGS) can now use the same license as HP Anyware (PCoIP). Promotion of Remote Boost included with all Z Workstations ends January 1, 2023.
November 2021	Remote Boost 2020.3.1	Added support for Windows 10 21H2, Windows 11, RHEL 8.5, macOS 12.
September 2021	Remote Boost 2020.3	Enhanced the certificate configuration workflow making it easier to configure and use signed certificates.; Added remote microphone support on Linux senders and Windows/Linux receivers allowing users to stream local microphone input to a remote system. Advanced Video Compression (AVC) on macOS is now fully supported.; Added support for RHEL 8.4. Various properties deprecated as part of backend video pipeline improvements.
May 2021	Remote Boost 2020.2	UI DPI scaling now supports fractional scaling e.g.150%. Added support for Game Mode on Linux senders, which enables the use of Unreal Engine when connecting from a Windows receiver to a Linux sender.; Advanced Video Compression (AVC) is now available as a preview on macOS.; Various performance improvements.; Dropped support for Windows 7, Windows 8, or RHEL 6. Linux packages have been updated with integrity signatures. Various properties deprecated as part of backend video pipeline improvements.
October 2020	Remote Boost 2020.1	Technology preview for enhanced Wacom support on Windows, macOS, RHEL and Ubuntu Receivers connecting to Windows and Linux Senders. hardware acceleration for AVC mode with GeForce (in addition to Quadro) graphics cards).; Greater admin control over which users can access Senders.
May 2020	RGS 7.7.1	RHEL 7.8 support. ThinPro 7.x support.; HP Velocity now supported on MacOS Receivers.; Frame rate improvement to reduce stutter for video playback.; Additional properties to set display resolution and layout of sender.
March 2020	Remote Boost 2020.0	New major version with support for new broker, HP ZCentral Connect.; New scaling of remote desktop window on receiver side without impacting resolution on sender side.; Auto-Launch files supported on Linux and macOS.; Borderless mode now supported on macOS. User interface adjusts to high DPI displays. Improvements to WACOM Cintiq and Intuos remoting on Linux to Linux connections.
January 2019	7.6	Decreased idle CPU usage on Linux senders using HP3.; Increased performance for AVC on Windows 10 senders with Intel graphics.; Added support for RHEL 6.10 and 7.6 and ThinPro 7.0.; A new property has been added for resolution matching on Windows Senders with NVIDIA graphics without a physical display.
May 2018	7.5	Bandwidth required for HP3 on Windows 10 is reduced. HP3 performance increase on Windows and Linux Sender. Experience controls Adaptive Image Quality is more responsive.; Experience improvements: As of version 7.5, the operating system manages the HP RGS Receiver Window frame and scrollbars.; The toolbar can be re-positioned horizontally by dragging the four dots at the left edge of the toolbar right or left.; When the Receiver Window size is increased beyond the size of the Sender desktop, black bars will appear around the image.; A new Hotkey, F, will fit the Receiver Window to the Sender desktop.
October 2017	7.4	Restarting the Linux Sender no longer requires a restart of the X Server.; Added support for RHEL 7.4 and SUSE 12 SP3. The FLEXnet license server for floating licenses must be version 11.14 or later to support RGS 7.4. Standard and Trial licenses are not affected. The FLEXnet license server is included with the HP RGS package.; 64-bit versions of the Sender and Receiver for Windows are now available. Future versions of RGS will deliver only the 64-bit Sender and Receiver. The 32 and 64-bit versions of RGS are compatible with each other. The 64-bit version of RGS is installed in C:\Program Files\HP by default.; If the Windows 10 version is updated after installing HP RGS, Remote USB may stop working. You will need to uninstall and then reinstall HP RGS. As of RGS 7.4, separate RGS installers are provided for different Linux Distributions.
February 2017	7.3.2	HP added support for SUSE Linux Enterprise 12.2 and HP ThinPro version 6.; MaxImageUpdateRate now applies to AVC mode. In previous releases this setting only applied to HP3 (the default image codec).; Smart card redirection on Windows receiver supports a wider range of smart card reader devices including virtual smart cards, (Requires RGS 7.3.2 or later on both sender and receiver. Smart card redirection is supported on the following senders: Windows 7, 8.1, and 10 and now RHEL 6, RHEL 7, and SUSE Linux® Enterprise 12. (Linux® support is new in 7.3.2.) Smart card redirection is supported on Windows receivers only. On Windows-based and ThinPro-based receivers, smart cards can be remoted using Remote USB.
October 2016	7.3.1	HP improved Windows sender performance when AMD and Intel graphics used. AVC mode performance improvements on Windows receivers. Improved resolution matching with Windows senders with NVidia graphics.; New property to improve Velocity performance when connecting via VPN.
August 2016	7.3 (receiver for macOS)	HP added an RGS receiver that runs native on macOS, allowing mac users to connect to Windows and Linux based workstations and virtual machines.
May 2016	7.2.3	Added Sender properties to more easily configure VMware virtual machine displays for use with Nvidia GRID graphics
March 2016	7.2.2	Enabled a smart card to be used to authenticate on a receiver and sender simultaneously for Windows
November 2015	7.2.0	Added support for Windows 10, Red Hat Enterprise Linux (RHEL) 7.2, Suse Linux Enterprise Desktop (SLED) 12.; Reduced the occurrence of receiver network connection warning screens. Other various fixes
April 2015	7.1.0	Improved performance with default HP3 codec, with higher framerate and/or higher screen resolution compared to 7.0. RGS HP3 can now use multiple CPU cores.; WACOM tablet remoting with full functionality for Linux to Linux sessions.; Improved audio experiences on Linux Advanced Video Compression (AVC) is now GPU-accelerated on Linux sender systems with GRID capable nVidia graphics devices. AVC on Linux also supports multi-monitor. AVC has been updated to the latest GRID SDK from nVidia on Windows and Linux platforms.; Support for RHEL 7.; New tools to configure properties via a UI, avoiding the need to directly edit the corresponding text based files (rgsenderconfig and rgreceiverconfig).
September 2014	7.0.1	Added support for ThinPro 4.4 and 5.0. Added a sender property that allows ordering and selection of RGS license types. Easy Login functionality is no longer limited to certain hardware platforms.
June 2014	7.0	Upgraded HP Velocity to version 2.1 to further improved connectivity and packet loss protection. Traffic protected by HP Velocity now uses UDP, rather than TCP.; Many new tablet features have been introduced: Gesture-to-hotkey mapping. Users can assign a series of keystrokes to a gesture via the new gestures tab in the UI. Virtual Mouse. The virtual mouse allows for precise onscreen mouse control on a tablet. Zoom & Pan. Tablet users are able to zoom and pan around the sender desktop. Various improvements to the user interface for touch optimization and improved toolbar control.
April 2014	6.0.5	Added support for ThinPro 4.4 and new Bloomberg Keyboards.; The use of the installer command line has changed. See the user guide for details.
March 2014	6.0.4	Added a sender property that allows collaboration without displaying a collaboration authorization dialog (see rgsenderconfig).
	6.0.2	Added support for Advanced Video Compression in directory mode.; Added support for RHEL 6.4. Enabled support for ThinPro 3.3, 4.1, 4.2 and 4.3.
February 2013	6.0	RGS has a new UI look and feel. All UI components associated with RGS have been enhanced to improve aesthetics and usability.; The RGS sender and receiver can be configured to encode screen updates with an H.264 codec. H.264 consumes less bandwidth when compared with legacy codecs in many situations. H.264 settings are available in the Performance tab of the Settings panel under "Advanced Video Compression".; The RGS sender and receiver provide an install-time option to enable HP Velocity WAN optimization. This optimization provides improved network performance when packet loss and latency are present in the environment.; Added support for Microsoft Windows 8 (desktop mode) for both Sender and Receiver.
June 2012	5.4.8	Added Linux Screen blanking. Support for SLED11 Sender. Support for RHEL6.2 Sender. IP address filtering. Linux Audio enhancements. ThinPro 4.1. Linux "easy login" equivalent.
October 2011	5.4.7	HP RGS now runs for free on HP Z Workstations and HP Mobile Workstations.
June 2011	5.4.6	The HP RGS Sender on Windows Vista and Windows 7 now supports Single Sign-On and Easy Login. The Windows Sender installer enforces prerequisites when enabling Single Sign-On or Easy Login on Windows XP. These are: enable Control-Alt-Delete, disable Fast User Switching, and disable AutoLogon.
January 2011	5.4.5	Mouse control improvement in Altair Hyperworks, Linux Audio Support for RHEL 4 and 5. Linux supported in a Virtual Machine.
April 2010	5.4.0	Windows 7 support.; Loss-less image codec.; Smartcard reader support for Vista.
September 2009	5.3.0	Windows Vista sender support. Open platform RGS sender support for HP and non-HP Windows XP and Vista Desktops, Notebooks and Workstations.; Text cut, copy, paste between Linux and Windows senders and receivers.; Hot keys for session minimize and disconnect. Auto remote selected USB devices at session connection and auto return to access client on session disconnect.; Local license file support
November 2008	5.2.0	Linux supports Norwegian keyboards. Windows Sender supports Traditional Chinese Korean and Russian Keyboards.; Linux sender supports remote audio.; Sender to sender cut and paste for Windows.; Linux sender supports match receiver resolution.; Receiver supports Windows Vista.
November 2003	HP Remote Workstation	Support for remote connection to HP Personal Workstations and collaboration

== See also ==
- Comparison of remote desktop software
