= Reprise License Manager =

- Developer(s): Reprise Software
- Initial release: 2006
- Stable release: 14.1 / September 18, 2020; 4 years ago
- Preview release: 14.2 / April 16, 2021; 3 years ago
- Written in: C/C++, Java
- Operating system: Windows, macOS, Linux, and various UNIXes
- Platform: Cross-platform
- Available in: English
- Type: software license management
- License: Proprietary
- Website: www.reprisesoftware.com/products/software-license-management.php

The Reprise License Manager (RLM) is the software licensing toolkit developed and marketed by Reprise Software, providing on-premises and cloud-based license management, license enforcement and product activation solutions for publishers of commercial software applications. The Reprise License Manager is used by over 800 Independent Software Vendors:

- Computer Modelling Group
- The Foundry Visionmongers
- Hewlett-Packard
- Intergraph
- SAP SE
- Siemens
- Tecplot
- Trimble Navigation
- ViaSat
- Live2D Cubism

== See also ==
- Copy protection
- Digital rights management
- Floating licensing
- License borrowing
- List of license managers
- Product activation
