= MARA Holdings =

American patent holding company

MARA Holdings, Inc.
- Formerly: Verve Ventures, Inc. (2010–2011); American Strategic Minerals Corporation (2011–2012); Marathon Patent Group (2012–2021); Marathon Digital Holdings (2021–2024)
- Type: Public
- Traded as: Nasdaq: MARA; S&P 600 component
- Founded: February 23, 2010; 16 years ago
- Headquarters: Hallandale Beach, Florida, U.S.
- Key people: Fred Thiel (CEO)
- Revenue: ▲US$907.1 million (2025)
- Total assets: ▲US$6.80 billion (2024)
- Number of employees: approx. 150 (July 2024)
- Website: mara.com

MARA Holdings, Inc. (formerly Marathon Digital Holdings and Marathon Patent Group) is an American digital asset technology and cryptocurrency mining company headquartered in Hallandale Beach, Florida. Founded in 2010, the company initially operated as a patent holding company before pivoting in the late 2010s to focus on blockchain infrastructure and digital assets.

MARA is one of the world's largest publicly traded bitcoin miners, commanding approximately 8% of the Bitcoin network's hashrate as of March 2026. As of June 30, 2026, the company held approximately 35,577 bitcoin on its balance sheet.. The company operates large-scale mining facilities in the United States and abroad, known for its purchases of bitcoin and bitcoin mining equipment and a joint venture to use 37 MW from the Hardin Generating Station Montana coal plant to power an adjacently-constructed Marathon bitcoin data center.

== History ==
Marathon Patent Group was incorporated on February 23, 2010, as a patent holding company headquartered in Fort Lauderdale, Florida. Through its subsidiary Uniloc, the company focused on acquiring patents and pursuing litigation against technology firms.

During the 2010s, Marathon acquired patents related to encryption technology. In the late 2010s, the company shifted their focus toward cryptocurrency and blockchain technologies. By 2021, it was known for large-scale purchases of bitcoin and mining equipment, and it entered into a joint venture to power a bitcoin data center using 37 megawatts from the Hardin Generating Station, a coal-fired plant in Montana.

On March 1, 2021, the company changed its name to Marathon Digital Holdings to reflect its new business focus.

In December 2023, Marathon acquired two operational bitcoin mining facilities from subsidiaries of Generate Capital for $178.6 million, expanding its mining capacity.

On August 29, 2024, the company rebranded again, adopting the name MARA Holdings, Inc.

== Leadership ==
Its chief executive officer is Fred Thiel. Leena Jaitley, founder of MTN group is one of the largest shareholders.

== Controversy ==
As Marathon Patent Group, the company gained a reputation as a "patent troll" due to its business model of acquiring patents with the sole purpose of suing other companies for infringement. Its subsidiary, Uniloc, was a prominent non-practicing entity that filed numerous lawsuits against well-known tech firms, leading to public criticism and a negative reputation.

In July 2024, a federal jury in California found Marathon liable for $138 million for breaching a non-circumvention agreement with investor Michael Ho. The jury concluded that Marathon used proprietary information and a bitcoin mining strategy Ho had provided in 2020, without compensating him as required under the agreement. Marathon stated that it respects the verdict but disputed the jury's findings and stated that the damages awarded have "no legal basis."

The Hardin, Montana joint venture drew regulatory and legal scrutiny after Marathon disclosed in November 2021 that it had received an SEC subpoena seeking documents related to the issuances of 6 million shares tied to the project. The company also faced multiple investor class-action lawsuits alleging misleading statements about the venture and its regulatory risks. While the lawsuits were voluntarily dismissed in October 2022, the event resulted in a significant drop in the company's stock price.

In May 2021, Marathon sparked widespread controversy within the cryptocurrency community by announcing that it would operate a "fully compliant" mining pool. The company stated that the pool would use software to filter out transactions from sanctioned entities on the U.S. Office of Foreign Assets Control (OFAC) list. This decision was met with immediate backlash from Bitcoin advocates and community members who criticized the move as a form of censorship that undermined the core, permissionless, and censorship-resistant principles of the Bitcoin network. Following the public outcry, Marathon reversed its decision in late May 2021, announcing it would no longer filter transactions.

In July 2024, Time magazine published an investigation into numerous noise and health complaints by residents of Granbury, Texas, many of whom attributed their ailments to a nearby Bitcoin mining facility owned and operated by Marathon Digital.

In November 2025, US district judge Reed O'Connor denied Marathon's request for a restraining order that sought to block Mitchell Bend, a rural area in Hood County, Texas, from voting on whether to incorporate as a city, which would allow the community to regulate a nearby Bitcoin mine owned by Marathon.

== See also ==
- Uniloc v. Microsoft
- Uniloc
