= RLM =

RLM may refer to:

- RLM, a wholly owned subsidiary of the Lockheed Martin Corporation, with significant presence in the Australian defence industry
- Real Life Ministries, a non-denominational Evangelical Christian church in Idaho
- Reasoning language model, a large language models further trained to solve multiple step reasoning tasks.
- Reichsluftfahrtministerium, the Ministry of Aviation (Germany) (1933–45)
- Rheinisches Landesmuseum (Rhineland State Museum)
- Right-to-left mark, a Unicode bidirectional formatting character
- Red Letter Media, an American video and film production company that has achieved fame for its "Plinkett Reviews"
- Reprise License Manager, a software toolkit providing license management
- In statistics, a robust linear model
- In computer software, release management
