= Per-seat license =

Software license model

A per-seat license (or "named user license") is a software license model based on the number of individual users, known as 'seats' in reference to them sitting in an office chair at a workstation, who have access to a digital service or product. For example, 50-user per-seat license would mean that up to 50 individual named users can access the program.

Per seat licensing is administered by providing user-level security to the directory containing the program. It contrasts with the concurrent user license, based on the number of simultaneous users (regardless of which individuals they are) accessing the program. It typically deals with software running in the server where users connect via the network. For example, in a 50-user concurrent use license, after 50 users are logged on to the program, the 51st user is blocked. When any one of the first 50 logs off, the next person can log on. Concurrent licensing can be managed by the application itself or via independent software metering tools.

Per seat licensing often imposes restrictions on the users. A user may be a person, software or device accessing the software. User licenses may be differentiated by user types, as authorized users, external user, internal user, qualified user, etc. User types to be taken into account are determined by the licensing requirements.

Per-seat licensing is common for products used by specialised professionals in industrial settings. In addition to computer programming, typical examples include chemists, molecular biologists, geographers, and designers.
