= Concurrent user =

User accessing a resource at the same time as another

In computer science, the number of concurrent users (sometimes abbreviated as CCU) for a resource in a location, with the location being a computing network or a single computer, refers to the total number of people simultaneously accessing or using the resource. The resource can, for example, be a computer program, a file, or the computer as a whole.

Keeping track of some concurrent users is important in several cases. First, some operating system models such as time-sharing operating systems allow several users to access a resource on the computer at the same time. As system performance may degrade due to the complexity of processing multiple jobs from multiple users at the same time, the capacity of such a system may be measured in terms of maximum concurrent users.

Second, commercial software vendors often license a software product by means of a concurrent users restriction. This allows a fixed number of users access to the product at a given time and contrasts with an unlimited user license. For example: Company X buys software and pays for 20 concurrent users. However, there are 100 logins created at implementation. Only 20 of those 100 can be in the system at the same time, this is known as floating licensing.

Concurrent user licensing allows firms to purchase computer systems and software at a lower cost because the maximum number of concurrent users expected to use the system or software at any given time (those users all logged in together) is only a portion of the total system users employed at a company. The concurrent licenses are global and shared by anyone who needs to use the system. This contrasts with "named-seats" licensing, in which one license must be purchased for each and every individual user, whether they are using the system or not.

If a company employs 400 system users in which 275 work during the day and 125 work at night, then they can opt to purchase only 275 concurrent user licenses since there will never be more than 275 users on the system during a normal work day. The night workers share 125 of the day users' licenses to use the system. For named-seat licenses, this same company would have to purchase 400 individual licenses, one for each user, and licenses would not be globally shared. The available options for licensing are entirely at the discretion of the vendor selling the product.

== See also ==
- Floating licensing
