= Key server =

Key server can mean:

- Key server (cryptographic), a server on which public keys are stored for others to use
- Key server (software licensing), a server that distributes software license keys
