= System Locked Pre-installation =

Product activation mechanism for Microsoft Windows

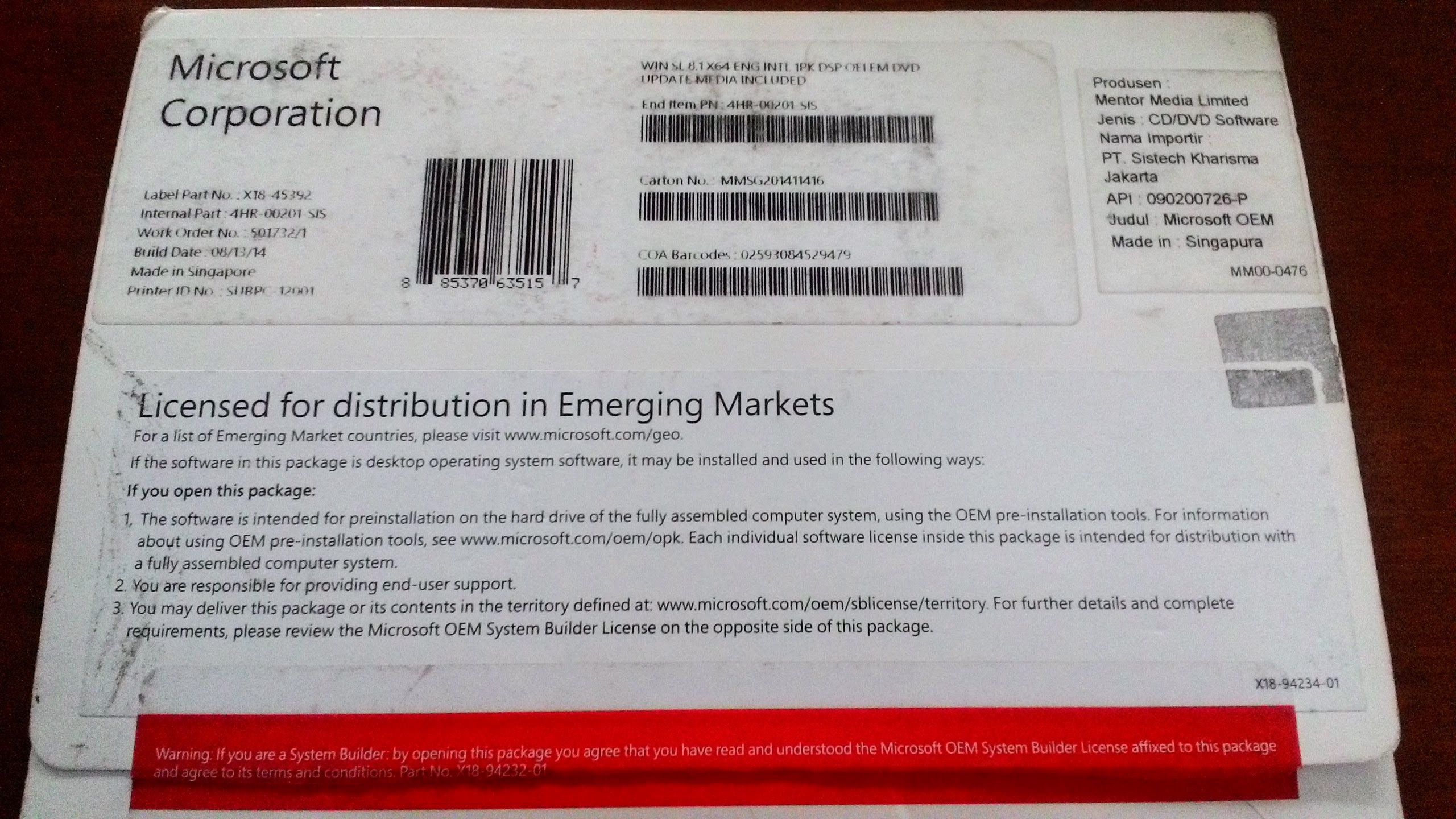
Example of OEM installer package for Windows 8.1, such installer is intended for OEM usage with SLP 3.0

System Locked Pre-installation (SLP), also referred to as OEM Activation (OA), is a product activation procedure for Microsoft Windows used by major OEMs of laptops and pre-built PCs wherein a Windows product key is added and locked to the machine's firmware (Legacy BIOS or UEFI) before mass distribution. SLP product keys cannot be moved to other machines.

== Details ==
SLP comes in eight different versions which roughly coincide with versions of Windows NT.

Operating systems that use SLP 1.0 check for a particular text-string in a computer's BIOS upon booting. If the text string does not match the information stored in the particular installation's OEM BIOS files, the system prompts the user to activate their copy as normal. SLP 2.0 to SLP 2.7 work in a similar manner. This effectively "locks" the operating system to the qualified motherboard. In addition, if an end-user feels the need to perform a "clean install" of Windows and if the manufacturer supplies the user with an installation disc (not a "System Recovery" disc that is a hard-drive image), the user will not be prompted to activate the copy, given that the installation is performed on the same motherboard. Furthermore, because the check only involves the BIOS and not hardware, a user is allowed to change virtually all hardware components within the machine except motherboard, a procedure that would normally trigger re-activation in retail copies of Windows. If the replacement board is the same brand and of the same broad vintage as the original, it will often be accepted by the OEM software. Manufacturers are generally only given a few SLP keys by Microsoft. A royalty has been paid by the manufacturer if the board has an SLP key. Each manufacturer is issued with their own modified copy of Windows XP or Windows 7 that recognizes their own unique keys. Windows 8 will install on any UEFI motherboard containing a valid encrypted Microsoft product key since a royalty has been prepaid. It is most probable that an individual OEM royalty is much less than the retail price of the same version of Windows.

The product key sticker attached to OEM computers, prior to Windows 8, will not activate the copy of windows supplied with the machine. Only the SLP key can do that and the product key is never requested during activation. The purpose of the external sticker with a key is not known with certainty, but it is most likely a way for Microsoft to check that items for retail sale have had a full royalty paid by the OEM.

SLP Versions
Version	Windows
SLP (1.0)	Windows XP, Windows Server 2003
SLP 2.0	Windows Vista, Windows Server 2008
SLP 2.1	Windows 7, Windows Server 2008 R2
SLP 2.2	Windows Server 2012
SLP 2.3	Windows Server 2012 R2
SLP 2.4	Windows Server 2016
SLP 2.5	Windows Server 2019
SLP 2.6	Windows Server 2022
SLP 2.7	Windows Server 2025
OA 3.0	Windows 8, Windows 8.1, Windows 10, Windows 11

SLP installations require a master product key issued by each OEM maker, which is unique to the specific edition of Windows, such as Home (XP), Home Basic, Home Premium, Professional, Ultimate, etc. This SLP key is different from the product key printed on the Certificate of Authenticity affixed to an OEM assembled PC; COA product key is used in cases when Windows license stored is invalidated for some reason and re-activation is required. On February 28, 2005, Microsoft attempted to reduce software piracy by invalidating COA keys for normal online activation and requiring phone activation, but this does not apply to SLP keys which can still be used for offline activation. If the product key used for activation is lost, then product key finders, readily available on the Internet, can decrypt the key from a local installation, however only SLP keys allow the user to avoid activation upon re-installation.

In the SLP 2.x implementations, BIOS report the ACPI SLIC table to the operating system.

However, since SLP 2.0 was introduced, hackers have been able to create modified bootloaders based on the bootloader GRUB4DOS; these are capable of emulating an SLP text string (such as one for Dell, Acer, and so on), so it appears to be present in the BIOS. This combined with an OEM certificate and OEM product key can instantly activate a Windows Vista/7 installation illegally but also be very hard to notice. This method can also be integrated into a Windows installation disk to activate on initial boot.

Another method consists of modding the BIOS to insert the SLP 2.1-2.7 table, which can be used to replace blacklisted keys, or to add the SLP table to motherboards that do not have it (such as Gigabyte). Some brand-name computers such as Dell, already have the SLP table in their BIOS, which means that using software readily available on the Internet, a pirated retail installation can be converted to OEM, and the appropriate certificate installed into the OS, which results in Windows becoming genuine. Pirates refer to copies of Windows activated in this way as Pirated Genuine Microsoft Software.

With SLP 3.0, OEM SLP keys are no longer used at all. Instead, a tool is used by the OEM to embed a unique key in each computer's BIOS, making consumer versions of Windows 8 and later very difficult to pirate using the SLP insertion technique. In the SLP 3.0 implementations, BIOS report the ACPI MSDM table to the operating system.

Microsoft released what they referred to as generic product keys (sometimes default keys or simply generic keys) that users can enter to avoid product activation on any SLP-enabled computer. These keys are entered only to use the operating system without an OEM product key, as new installations require entering a product key before being able to access the desktop. Windows versions with their respective generic keys will have limited functionalities, and these keys will not result in activation. (Note: The following keys are not volume license keys. The installation source must also be SLP-enabled by the manufacturer. Microsoft has not publicly released an SLP key for Windows XP Home Edition, but the actual key from any SLP-activated installation of XP Home can be used on any other, regardless of brand. SLP-enabled installation CDs usually supply the needed key automatically, without the user having to enter one.)

Generic product keys
Product Name	Product Key
Windows XP Professional	MVF4D-W774K-MC4VM-QY6XY-R38TB
Windows XP Professional x64 Edition	FM634-HJ3QK-6QVTY-RJY4R-XCR9J
Windows XP Tablet PC Edition	XT67V-GY7FW-GR6FR-WDK2C-8T97J
Windows Server 2003 R2 Standard Edition x86	PWBJC-22697-D4CVH-FCJWW-DTF9J
Windows Server 2003 R2 Standard Edition x64	XCP6P-7WVXP-F8FQ4-JV6CD-6XV28
Windows Server 2003 R2 Enterprise Edition x86	XHPV3-PTCWJ-7Y94F-Q6BVH-J849J
Windows Server 2003 R2 Enterprise Edition x64	WQ3GW-Y8GQW-8VJYB-JYM43-D24C8
Windows Server 2003 R2 Datacenter Edition x86	FXYF6-VTXGX-3JPX9-HJ9K4-6TKTW
Windows Server 2003 R2 Datacenter Edition x64	KDX8X-FYW4T-C6D9J-BKM6M-M89TW
Windows Server 2003 R2 Web Edition x86	GM8KD-GB7JY-QGQYP-XRV74-RT728
Windows 8 (Core)	46V6N-VCBYR-KT9KT-6Y4YF-QGJYH
Windows 8 Professional	V7C3N-3W6CM-PDKR2-KW8DQ-RJMRD
Windows 8 N	7QNT4-HJDDR-T672J-FBFP4-2J8X9
Windows 8 Professional N	4NX4X-C98R3-KBR22-MGBWC-D667X
Windows 8 Single Language	NH7GX-2BPDT-FDPBD-WD893-RJMQ4
Windows 10 Home	46J3N-RY6B3-BJFDY-VBFT9-V22HG
Windows 10 Home N	PGGM7-N77TC-KVR98-D82KJ-DGPHV
Windows 10 Home Single Language	GH37Y-TNG7X-PP2TK-CMRMT-D3WV4
Windows 10 China	68WP7-N2JMW-B676K-WR24Q-9D7YC
Windows 10 Pro	RHGJR-N7FVY-Q3B8F-KBQ6V-46YP4
Windows 10 Pro N	RHGJR-N7FVY-Q3B8F-KBQ6V-46YP4

The OEM generic keys for versions of Windows later than XP will install the operating system in trial mode, and will request a new key after the trial period is up.

== Non System Locked Pre-installation ==
Non System Locked Pre-installation, abbreviated NSLP or NONSLP, is a similar Windows activation procedure. The product key is added into the machine's firmware, but is not locked to it and can be moved to other machines.

== See also ==
- Windows Preinstallation Environment
- Windows 8.1
