= Metering =

Metering may refer to:

- Measuring instrument: Device for measuring a physical quantity.
- Ramp meter: Device; usually a basic traffic light or a two-section signal (red and green only, no yellow) light together with a signal controller that regulates the flow of traffic.
- Light meter: A way of measuring the amount of light, and typically used to determine the proper exposure for a photograph.
- Metering mode: The way a camera determines the light procured for an exposure
- Water metering

== See also ==
- Software metering
