= UsedSoft =

Swiss software licence broker

- Native name: UsedSoft
- Company type: Aktiengesellschaft (AG, joint stock company under Swiss law)
- Industry: Internet commerce
- Founded: 2003; 23 years ago
- Founder: Peter Schneider
- Headquarters: Zug, Switzerland
- Key people: Michael Aufderheide (CEO) Johannes Jäger (Managing Director Germany)
- Services: Reselling used software licenses
- Revenue: EUR 25 million (2020)
- Website: www.usedsoft.com/en/

UsedSoft (stylized usedSoft in both English and German) is a Swiss used-software commerce company which instituted a business-to-business (B2B) market for used computer programs. The company is headquartered in Zug, Switzerland.

== History and company structure ==
UsedSoft was founded in 2003 by Peter Schneider.

The companies UsedSoft Deutschland GmbH (Dortmund) and UsedSoft Europe (Amsterdam) are wholly owned subsidiaries and distributors of UsedSoft International AG.

Sales work is performed by a sales organization consisting of some 40 persons active all over Germany and Europe. UsedSoft also launched an online shop in 2013.

When Schneider died in June 2022 after a serious illness, existing executives Johannes Jäger and Michael Aufderheide took over the operation of the company.

== Business model ==
UsedSoft purchases and sells standard computer programs that have already been used by other users. Since it does not suffer from wear and tear, unlike other products, "used" software retains the same quality as a brand new product. Licenses on the used market are available at around 30% below the price of new software.

UsedSoft maintains business operations exclusively in Europe. Its customer base includes large companies, SMEs, and public agencies, including Edeka, Woolworth, Harry Broth, s.Oliver, Segafredo, the airports of Munich and Salzburg, law firms, an association in Germany's Bundesliga soccer league, savings and loans banks, as well as the City of Munich, Germany's Federal Social Court in Kassel, and the Thuringia Police.

== Legal foundation ==
The legal foundation for used software trade rests on the "principle of exhaustion" in copyright law. This principle lays out that a manufacturer's distribution right to a product is "exhausted" the first time it brings the product into circulation. Thus, the buyer can resell the product secondhand. In Europe, EU Directive 2009/24/EC expressly permits trading in used computer programs.

=== ECJ ruling ===
From 2005 to 2012, Oracle and UsedSoft GmbH were involved in a legal dispute in Germany on the question of whether UsedSoft is permitted to trade used Oracle software licenses. The dispute was taken all the way to Germany's Federal Court of Justice, the country's highest court, which ultimately passed the case to the European Court of Justice (ECJ) for adjudication.

The ECJ's ruling was announced on 3 July 2012 (case C-128/11). The ECJ ruled, barring further recourse for appeal, that the principle of exhaustion applies to every first-time sale of software. Thus, used software trade has been declared fundamentally legal. According to the Court, this also applies to software that has been transmitted online. The ECJ even laid out that the second acquirer of computer programs that have been transmitted online may download the software from the manufacturer:

"In such circumstances, the exhaustion of the distribution right [...] extends to the copy of the computer program sold as corrected and updated by the copyright holder",

according to the ECJ. However, the ruling stated that resellers could not break up a license in order to sell only part of it, for example if they have purchased licenses for more users than they needed and wanted to sell off the surplus: the IT press reported this aspect of the ruling as "a small victory" for software licensors.

== See also ==
- Discount-Licensing
- Volume license key
