= Kreidler (disambiguation) =

Kreidler, a German manufacturer of motorcycles Kreidler may also refer to:

- Kreidler, a band from Germany
- Kreidler, an eponymous album by band Kreidler
- Kreidler (surname)
