= PDX =

PDX may refer to:

== Places ==
- Portland, Oregon, US
  - Portland International Airport (IATA code)
  - Portland Union Station (railway code)

== Brands and enterprises ==
- PDX, a line of musical instruments and equipment by Vestax
- Paradox Interactive, a Swedish video game publisher
  - Paradox Development Studio, the in-house game development team of the above

== Computing and technology ==
- Paradox (warez), a warez–demogroup; an anonymous group of software engineers that devise ways to defeat software and video game licensing protections, a process known as cracking

== Science and healthcare ==
- Pancreatic and duodenal homeobox protein, a transcription factor
- Patient-derived xenograft, human tumor grown in mice
- PDX, principal diagnosis (see Medical diagnosis#Concepts related to diagnosis), the main cause of a patient's need for treatment

== Other uses ==
- PDX.edu, domain name of Portland State University, Oregon
- Performance Driving eXperience, an event sanctioned by the Sports Car Club of America

== See also ==
- KPDX, a television station in the Portland, Oregon area
