= Kreidler (surname) =

Kreidler is a surname of several possible origins. It may be a German and Yiddish occupational surname derived from an occupation related to chalk, from Gegman Kreide, "chalk". It may be a toponymic surname for someone from Kreidel. Notable people with the surname include:

- Johannes Kreidler (born 1980), German composer, performer, conceptual and media artist
- Mike Kreidler (born 1943), American physician and politician
- Rosie Bonds Kreidler (born 1944), former American athlete
- Ryan Kreidler (born 1997), American baseball player
