= Discount-Licensing =

British software licence broker

- Founded: July 2004
- Founder: Noel Unwin and Jonathan Horley
- Website: discount-licensing.com

Discount-Licensing (formerly known as Disclic) is a Burton-upon-Trent, UK-based vendor or broker of secondhand Microsoft software licences. It is notable for being the first company to establish a secondary market in such licences which is accepted by Microsoft as being valid.

== History ==
Discount-Licensing was founded as Disclic Ltd in July 2004 by Noel Unwin and Jonathan Horley. In 2006 Disclic Ltd changed its name to Discount-Licensing.com Ltd.

When Discount-Licensing launched, it was predicted that it, and other companies like it, would have a significant disruptive effect on Microsoft's pricing and its resellers and some resellers reacted with shock and anger however this disruption has not materialised and the secondhand licence market remains small compared to the primary market. Only a few other companies, such as German firms UsedSoft, preo Software and Susensoftware and British firm Value Licensing have sought to enter the market for secondhand Microsoft software. Instead, the secondhand licence market exists as a smaller "parallel market" selling to companies who require licences for specific previous versions of Microsoft products, or who might not otherwise have purchased licences due to the cost.

== Business model ==
Discount-Licensing trades in Microsoft Open, Select, Enterprise volume as well as SAP licences. It typically obtains these from the liquidators of companies which have ceased trading or which are downsizing their IT requirements. These are then sold on to customers at a discount to the cost of new licences. This allows customers to purchase licences for non-current as well as current Microsoft versions, which they may have standardised on.

Only Microsoft products with licences that permit transfer (either explicitly or by means of legal loopholes in the licence) are offered. These include Microsoft Office, Windows Server licences and Client Access Licenses, Microsoft Exchange and Microsoft SQL Server but exclude any desktop versions of Windows or any rights under Software Assurance.

The actual licence transfer can sometimes be facilitated directly between the original owner and the new owner, without Discount-Licensing taking ownership of the licences. Licences are supplied in the form of licence agreement numbers which the recipient can register in Microsoft Volume Licensing Service Center in order to obtain the volume license keys. Following the completion of all paperwork, Microsoft updates it records to reflect the new user, but note that the VLSC does not necessarily show the legal owner. In the case of licences created after October 2007, the sale may sometimes require the creation and transfer of a "shelf company" which owns the licences.

Only whole licences may be transferred so the customer has to choose from the agreements available and may not be able to obtain exactly the combination of licences desired.

The company operates internationally and, following advice from Microsoft that it was permissible, has transferred licences between countries.

The legalities of the secondary-volume and digital-software markets were reaffirmed in a 3 July 2012 European Court of Justice ruling which involved the Exhaustion Principle and the Software Directive 2009.

In addition to the CJEU ruling, several other legal decisions have further clarified the legality of secondhand software licenses: the Münster Public Procurement Chamber ruling (01.03.2016, ref. VK 1-2/16), which reaffirms the principles established by the CJEU and emphasizes the right of software license holders to resell their licenses, and the Federal Court of Justice ruling (17.07.2013, Case I ZR 129/08), which confirms the legality of secondhand software licenses, shedding light on the issue at the national level.

== Relationship with Microsoft ==
Microsoft has made it clear that it regards the resale of licences as exploiting an unintended loophole in the provisions for divestiture in its pre-2007 licence agreements. In October 2007 Microsoft introduced a clause prohibiting resale of all types of licences into its EULAs. This was intended to prevent licences issued after this date from being resold, however a further loophole was found to enable licences to continue to be sold, albeit in a more complicated way. Despite this game of cat and mouse, Microsoft accepts the legality of Discount-Licensing's business model and Discount-Licensing remains a Registered Microsoft Partner and authorised Microsoft Reseller. Discount-Licensing describes its relationship with Microsoft as "fairly good".

== See also ==
- Software license agreement
