= Electronics manufacturing services =

Field in manufacturing

Electronics manufacturing services (EMS) is a term used for companies that design, manufacture, test, distribute, and provide return/repair services for electronic components and assemblies for original equipment manufacturers (OEMs). The concept is also referred to as electronics contract manufacturing (ECM).

EMS companies can provide services across the electronics manufacturing process, including printed circuit board assembly, component sourcing, new product introduction, design for manufacturability (DFM) reviews, testing, and box-build or system integration. Depending on the provider, services may range from a single manufacturing process to full-service production that includes procurement, assembly, testing, warehousing, and after-sales support. EMS providers may also support products from prototype and initial production through larger-volume manufacturing.

Many high-volume consumer electronic products have been built in China and countries of Southeast Asia, due to the speed of manufacture of high-volume low-cost electronics in those locations, as opposed to the United States. Cities such as Shenzhen, China and Penang, Malaysia have become important production centres for the industry, attracting many consumer electronics companies such as Apple Inc. Some companies such as Flex and Wistron are original design manufacturers and providers of electronics manufacturing services.

== History ==
The EMS industry was initially established in 1961 by SCI Systems of Huntsville Alabama. The industry realized its most significant growth in the 1980s; at the time, most electronics manufacturing for large-scale product runs was handled by the OEMs in-house assembly. These new companies offered flexibility and eased human resources issues for smaller companies doing limited runs. The business model for the EMS industry is to specialize in large economies of scale in manufacturing, raw materials procurement and pooling together resources, industrial design expertise as well as create added value services such as warranty and repairs. This frees up the customer who does not need to manufacture and keep huge inventories of products. Therefore, they can respond to sudden spikes in demand more quickly and efficiently.

The development of surface mount technology (SMT) on printed circuit boards (PCB) allowed for the rapid assembly of electronics. By the mid-1990s the advantages of the EMS concept became compelling and OEMs began outsourcing PCB assembly (PCBA) on a large scale. By the end of the 1990s and early 2000s, many OEMs sold their assembly plants to EMSs, aggressively vying for market share. A wave of consolidation followed as the more cash-flush EMS firms were able to buy up quickly both existing plants as well as smaller EMS companies.

EMS has also started to provide design services used in conceptual product development advice and mechanical, electrical and software design assistance. Testing services perform in-circuit, functional, environmental, agency compliance, and analytical laboratory testing. Electronics manufacturing services are located throughout the world and provide numerous benefits. They vary in terms of production capabilities and comply with various quality standards and regulatory requirements.

== E^{2}MS ==
E^{2}MS (Electronic Engineering Manufacturing Service) refers to the strategy of integrating product development, prototyping and industrialization services into a traditional EMS business, with the aim to harness potential synergies. A typical E^{2}MS offering will start in the design phase, then continue to support the client in development, prototyping, tooling and production all the way to the testing phase, allowing for faster ramp-up as the product is prepared for mass-production up-front.

The term E^{2}MS was first coined by Escatec and has since been adopted by numerous Tier 2 and Tier 3 producers. Larger companies (Tier 1) have gone even further and offered full concept to mass-production and often taking a stake in the intellectual property, becoming more similar to ODM companies.
