= Johannes Kreidler =

German composer (born 1980)

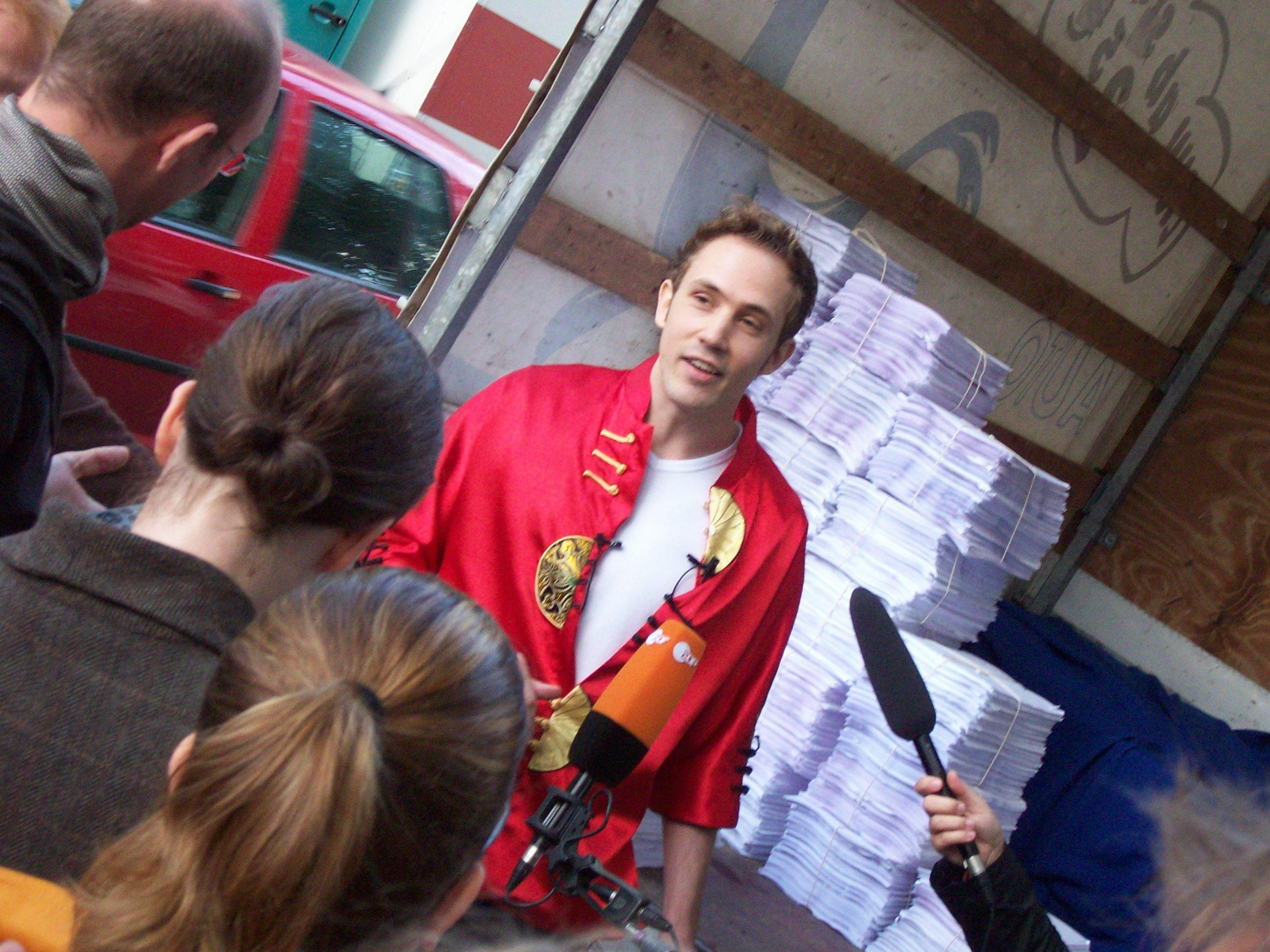
- Kreidler performing product placements in 2008
- Born: Johannes Kreidler; 1980 (age 45–46); Esslingen am Neckar, Baden-Württemberg, West Germany
- Education: Hochschule für Musik Freiburg
- Occupations: Composer; Artist; Theorist
- Organizations: City of Basel Music Academy
- Website: www.kreidler-net.de/english/index.html

Johannes Kreidler (born 1980) is a German composer, performer, conceptual and media artist. He is the principal theorist and exponent of the New Conceptualism movement in 21st-century music.

== Career ==
Johannes Kreidler was born in Esslingen, Germany. He studied composition with Mathias Spahlinger at the Musikhochschule in Freiburg from 2000–2006, and has taught at conservatories in Rostock, Detmold, Hannover and Hamburg. In 2019, he was made Professor for Composition and Music Theatre at the Musikakademie Basel.

Kreidler came to prominence with a series of politically charged pieces of musical performance art, beginning with 2008's product placements: a 33-second recording containing 70,200 samples of other recordings, which the composer then attempted to register individually with the German copyright authorities. This action garnered substantial press coverage, as did 2009's Charts Music, in which stock market data from the 2008 financial crisis was turned into music using Microsoft Songsmith. Later in 2009, Kreidler realised the controversial work Fremdarbeit (Outsourcing), in which he 'outsourced' his commission from Klangwerkstatt Berlin to a Chinese composer and an Indian computer programmer to write the piece on his behalf, imitating his style, for a fraction of the commission fee.

These three compositions came to encapsulate the composer's approach to 'conceptual music', as theorised by Kreidler himself and by the philosopher Harry Lehmann in subsequent lectures, essays and publications. Since 2010, the composer's catalogue has included many more 'conceptual pieces' — often video works for gallery or online display — in addition to large-scale music theatre works like the seven-hour Audioguide (2014), the opera My State as Friend and Beloved (2018), and Selbstauslöser (Self-Timer, 2020).

In October 2012, Kreidler garnered further press attention after protesting the forced merger of the SWR Symphonieorchester with another orchestra (the Stuttgart Radio Symphony Orchestra) by tying together and then destroying two of the orchestra's instruments onstage during a live concert.

Kreidler's works have been performed at the Donaueschingen and Darmstadt festivals, Ultima Festival Oslo, Musica Strasbourg, Gaudeamus Music Week, and the Huddersfield Contemporary Music Festival, among others. Kreidler currently lives in Berlin.

== Style ==
Much of Johannes Kreidler's music is characterised by extensive sampling and quotation, and the use of algorithmic processes to generate material. In pieces such as product placements and Der „Weg der Verzweiflung“ (Hegel) ist der chromatische (2012), these techniques are employed as much for the theoretical questions they raise about creativity and authorship as for their usefulness as compositional tools. Kreidler has described this approach in terms of making 'music with music'.

Often his work makes use of a particular digital technology, using the nature and limits of that technology to determine musical parameters. This has included Microsoft's Songsmith software (Charts Music), Microsoft's Kinect 3D Sensor (kinect studies), a MIDI keyboard (5 Programmings of a MIDI Keyboard), a sensor table (Irmat Studies) and a photographic camera (Steady Shot). Kreidler's work usually involves multimedia elements, sometimes in interaction with a live soloist or ensemble. He often appears as a performer in his own work, including in his often humorous video works which are inspired by meme culture.

Kreidler's work is often overtly political. At the premiere of his Fremdarbeit, the composer announced, "Tonight's goal is that no one here will ever vote for the FDP again" (referring to the German Free Democratic Party who are associated with economic liberalism and free-market capitalism).

== Conceptual music ==
Since the early 2010s, Johannes Kreidler has increasingly described his compositional approach as Konzeptmusik or 'conceptual music', a direct reference to the conceptual art movement of the 1960s and 1970s. (Note: Kreidler's lecture 'Sentences on Musical Concept-Art' borrowed its title from Sol LeWitt's 'Sentences on Conceptual Art' from 1968.) This paradigm of conceptual music is heavily indebted to the work and theory of his teacher Mathias Spahlinger, and to the philosopher Harry Lehmann's notion of the 'Gehalt-aesthetic Turn'.

In his lectures and essays, Kreidler has also described other works in these terms, including those of Cory Arcangel, Peter Ablinger and John Cage. His 2015 piece Minusbolero is a piece of 'conceptual music' that attempts a dialogue with another historical piece of 'conceptual music': Ravel's Boléro. Ravel himself said of his piece, 'I have written only one masterpiece — Boléro. Unfortunately there is no music in it'. In composing Minusbolero, Kreidler simply removed the melody throughout, leaving only the accompaniment. Thus, if the original Bolero contained 'no music', Kreidler's Minusbolero contained 'negative' music.

The validity and significance of Kreidler's theories of conceptual music has been the subject of considerable academic dispute. Max Erwin has identified 'New Conceptualism' as a coherent aesthetic orientation for a significant group of composers from at least four continents, including Kreidler, Stefan Prins and Jennifer Walshe. According to Erwin, '[New Conceptualism] is arguably the first coherent aesthetic 'school' in New Music of the twenty-first century'. In contrast, while acknowledging that it had 'gone mainstream' in 2014, Martin Iddon has called conceptual music 'a contradiction in terms' that 'represents a desire for a (nostalgic) return to conceptual art that, as it were, really meant something'.

== Awards ==
- 2009 — Winner of the Operare Music Theatre Prize
- 2009/10 — Winner of the Fonds experimentelles Musiktheater NRW Music Theatre Prize
- 2010 — Winner of the German Authors Award's Young Talent Prize
- 2010 — Darmstadt Summer Courses for New Music Scholarship Prize
- 2011 — Academy of Arts Berlin Scholarship Prize
- 2012 — Kranichstein Music Prize
- 2013 — Kunststiftung Baden-Württemberg Scholarship

== Compositions (selection) ==
=== Concert music ===
- Piece for Harp and Video (2018)
- Lippenstift for choir, audio and video accompaniment (2016)
- The Wires for cello, audio and video accompaniment (2016)
- Typogravitism for electric guitar, audio and video accompaniment (2016)
- Instrumentalisms for instrument and video (2016)
- Two Pieces for Clarinet and Video (2016)
- TT1 for large orchestra and electronics (2014/2015)
- Steady Shot for piano, photo camera, audio and video playback (2015)
- Minusbolero for large orchestra (2009–2014)
- Irmat Studies for sensor table (2013)
- Shutter Piece for eight instruments, audio and video playback (2013), premiered at the Wittener Tagen für neue Kammermusik
- Der „Weg der Verzweiflung“ (Hegel) ist der chromatische for nine instruments, audio and video playback (2012), premiered at the Donaueschinger Musiktage
- Die „sich sammelnde Erfahrung“ (Benn): der Ton for six instruments, audio and video playback (2012)
- study for piano, audio and video playback (2011)
- Stil 1 for variable instrumentation and tape (2010)
- Living in a Box for large ensemble, sampler and video (2010)
- Fremdarbeit for four instruments and moderator (2009)
- Kantate. No future now for large ensemble and sampler (2008)
- in hyper intervals for four instruments and tape (2008)
- cache surrealism for baritone saxophone, accordion, cello and tape (2008)
- Dekonfabulation for accordion, percussion, female speaker and tape (2007/08)
- 5 Programmings for a MIDI Keyboard (2006)
- windowed 1 for percussion and tape (2006)
- Piano Piece 5 for piano and four-channel tape (2005)
- RAM Microsystems for joysticks (2005)

=== Stage works ===
- Selbstauslöser (2019), Volksbühne Berlin/BAM! Festival
- My State as Friend and Beloved (2018), Halle Opera House
- Infinissage (2018)
- Industrialisation of the Romantic (2016), Operncafé Halle
- Audioguide III (2015), KunstFestSpiele Herrenhausen
- Audioguide (2014), Darmstadt Summer Course for New Music/Ultima Festival Oslo
- Feeds. Hören TV (2009/10), Musiktheater im Revier, Gelsenkirchen

=== Performance actions ===
- Earjobs (2011)
- Call Wolfgang (2008)
- product placements (2008)

=== Video work ===
- Film 3 (2018)
- Film 2 (2017)
- Film 1 (2017)
- 22 music pieces for video (2014)
- Scanner Studies (2012)
- Split Screen Studies (2012)
- kinect studies (2011/13)
- Compression Sound Art (2009)
- Charts Music (2009)

=== Graphical works ===
- Album (2015)
- Sheet Music (2013)

=== Radio plays ===
- Listomania (2016), Hessischer Rundfunk 2016

== Publications ==
- Sheet Music (Paris: Allia, 2018)
- Sätze über musikalische Konzeptkunst: Texte 2012–2018 (Hofheim am Taunus: Wolke Verlag, 2018)
- Musik mit Musik: Texte 2005–2011 (Hofheim am Taunus: Wolke Verlag, 2012)
- Musik, Ästhetik, Digitalisierung — Eine Kontroverse [A public debate between Harry Lehmann, Claus-Steffen Mahnkopf and Johannes Kreidler] (Hofheim am Taunus: Wolke Verlag, 2010)
- Programming Electronic Music in Pure Data (Hofheim am Taunus: Wolke Verlag, 2008)
