= Fred Thiel =

American businessman

- Born: 1960 (age 65–66); France
- Education: Stockholm School of Economics
- Occupation: Business executive
- Known for: Influential in growth of cryptocurrency
- Board member of: Marathon Digital Holdings; NoCell Technologies; Oden Technologies; Sequent Software; OptConnect Inc.; Gatekeeper Systems

Fred Thiel (born 1960) is an American business executive and the CEO of Thiel Advisors and cryptocurrency mining company MARA Holdings. Thiel is the former CEO of GameSpy, Local Corporation, and Lantronix.

Thiel serves as past chairman of the board of the Young Presidents' Organization's technology network and is chairman of the Fintech subnetwork. He also serves on the boards of several other companies including Oden Technologies, OptConnect, Gatekeeper Systems, and Sequent Software.

== Early life and education ==
Thiel was born in France in a European-American household and moved to the United States when he was a one year old. Thiel attended classes at the Stockholm School of Economics and executive classes at Harvard Business School. Thiel is also fluent in English, Spanish, Swedish and French. Thiel is a frequent speaker on digital trends, IT, and the transformation of industries by the "internet of things".

== Career ==
Thiel was vice president and general manager of the business storage unit of CMD Technology in 1997. From 1998 to 2002 Thiel was the CEO of Lantronix, Thiel was the CEO of GameSpy from 2003 to 2004 before GameSpy merged with IGN. Thiel was the managing partner of the software group at Triton Pacific Capital Partners from 2007 to 2012.

Thiel met Heath Clark, founder and CEO of Local Corporation through the Young Presidents' Organization, and joined Local Corporation's board of directors in January 2013. He became the chairman of the board of Local Corporation in January 2014, and CEO in May 2014 following Clark's resignation for health reasons. Thiel was CEO until 2015, and was responsible for Local Corporation's partnership with FraudLogix to prevent advertising fraud.

Thiel has headed Thiel Advisors, an advisory firm, since 2013. Through Thiel Advisors, Thiel advises organizations such as EQT AB and Graham Partners, their portfolio companies, and various mid-sized companies on value creation strategies. Thiel was appointed to the board of directors of Marathon Patent Group in April 2018 and became CEO of Marathon Digital Holdings in April 2021
