= Original equipment manufacturer =

Company that fabricates parts used in another company's products

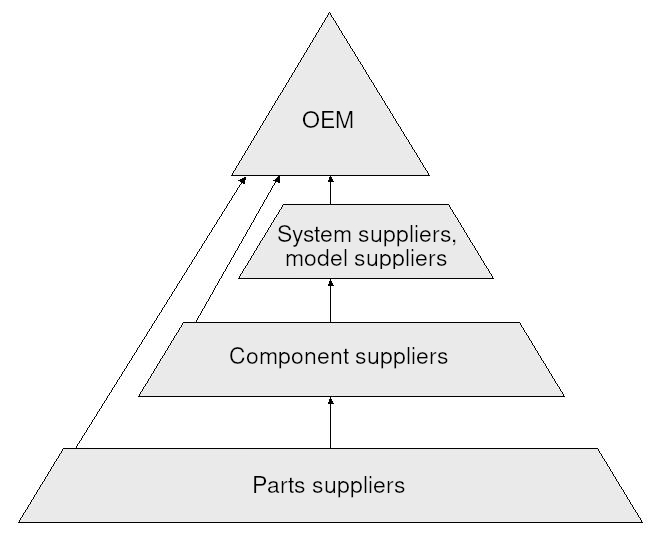
Supply chain pyramid

An original equipment manufacturer (OEM) is a company that produces parts and equipment that may be marketed by another company. The term is ambiguous, with several other common usages: an OEM can be the maker of a system that includes other companies' subsystems, an end-product producer, an automotive part that is manufactured by the same company that produced the original part used in the automobile's assembly, or a value-added reseller.

OEM manufacturing is also widely used in the packaging industry, particularly in the production of customized gift boxes for wine and spirits. These OEM producers allow brands to create unique holiday packaging without maintaining their own manufacturing facilities.

The term OEM may sometimes be used interchangeably with original design manufacturer (ODM) and original brand manufacturer (OBM).

== OEM term usage ==
The term "OEM" is ambiguous and used in different ways for different product manufacturing methods.

IP and engineering	Consumer brand owner	Accurate term	Example
Client	Client	Contract manufacturer; often labeled as OEM	The product is designed by and its intellectual property owned by a company. The company gives the blueprint to a factory to assemble. - e.g. Nike footwear.
Factory	Client	Original design manufacturer; often labeled as OEM	The product is designed mostly or entirely by the factory's own engineers. Other companies pick the factory's design from a catalog and license their own brand on it. - e.g. Vestel televisions.
Company	Company	Original brand manufacturer; often labeled as OEM	The product is designed by and its intellectual property owned by a company. The company handles assembly in its self-owned factories. - e.g. Zara clothing.

== Automotive parts ==
When referring to auto parts, OEM typically refers to the manufacturer of the original equipment, that is, the parts which are then subsequently assembled and installed during the construction of a new vehicle. In contrast, aftermarket parts are those made by companies other than the OEM, which might be installed as replacements or enhancements after the car comes out of the factory. For example, if Ford used Autolite spark plugs, Exide batteries, Bosch fuel injectors, and Ford's own engine blocks and heads when building a car, then car restorers and collectors consider those to be the OEM parts. Other-brand parts would be considered aftermarket, such as Champion spark plugs, DieHard batteries, Kinsler fuel injectors, and BMP engine blocks and heads.

Many auto parts manufacturers sell parts through multiple channels, for example to car makers for installation during new vehicle construction, to car makers for resale as automaker‑branded replacement parts, and through general merchandising supply chains. Any given brand of part can be OEM on some vehicle models and aftermarket on others.

Not all auto parts are available in OEM versions. In some cases, vehicle manufacturers secure exclusive sales rights for specific components. These parts are produced by contracted suppliers and carry the automaker's branding, but the suppliers are not permitted to sell them independently under their own name.

== Computer software ==
=== Windows ===
Microsoft is a popular example of a company that issues its Windows operating systems for use by OEM computer manufacturers via the bundling of Microsoft Windows. OEM product keys are priced lower than their retail counterparts, especially as they are purchased in bulk quantities, although they use the same software as retail versions of Windows. They are primarily for PC manufacturer OEMs and system builders, and as such are typically sold in volume licensing deals to a variety of manufacturers (Dell, HP, ASUS, Acer, Lenovo, etc.).

These OEMs commonly use a procedure known as System Locked Pre-installation, which pre-activates Windows on PCs that are to be sold via mass distribution. These OEMs also commonly bundle software that is not installed on stock Windows on the images of Windows that will be deployed with their PCs (appropriate hardware drivers, anti-malware and maintenance software, various apps, etc.).

Individuals may also purchase OEM "system-builder" licenses for personal use (to include virtual hardware), or for sale/resale on PCs which they build. Per Microsoft's EULA regarding PC manufacturers and system-builder OEM licenses, the product key is tied to the PC motherboard which it is initially installed on, and there is typically no transferring the key between PCs afterward. This is in contrast to retail keys, which may be transferred, provided they are only activated on one PC at a time. A significant hardware change will trigger a reactivation notice, just as with retail.

Direct OEMs are officially held liable for things such as installation/recovery media, and as such were commonly provided until the late-2000s. These were phased out in favor of recovery partitions located on the primary storage drive of the PC (and available for order from the manufacturer upon request) for the user to repair or restore their systems to the factory state. This not only cut down on costs, but was also a consequence of the gradual obsolescence and phasing out of optical media from 2010 onward. System builders also have a different requirement regarding installation media from Direct OEMs.

While a clean retail media of Windows can be installed and activated on these devices with OEM keys (most commonly using the SLP key that's embedded in to the system firmware already), actual OEM recovery media that was created by the PC manufacturer (not system-builder, nor retail Windows versions) typically only works on the PC model line that was designed for it. For example, a recovery disc/USB for a Toshiba Satellite P50-B will only work on that model, and not a Satellite S55T.

=== Android ===
The OEM smartphone manufacturers, such as Samsung, Sony and Xiaomi, are manufacturers of hardware and software of smartphones. Such manufacturers usually customize and adapt suitable Android operating system, with manufacturer components such as One UI and HyperOS.

== Skateboards ==
Skateboard decks are primarily produced by a small number of specialized OEMs, such as PS Stix, BBS, and Dwindle. These manufacturers handle the entire production process, including sourcing high-quality wood, crafting molds, gluing and pressing multiple layers of veneer, and applying graphics designed by the brands to the decks. Once completed, the finished products are distributed to skateboarding brands, which sell them under their respective labels.

== Other examples ==
Foxconn is one example of an OEM, which helps upstream companies such as Nokia and Hewlett Packard Enterprise to manufacture servers. The designed intellectual property are usually owned by upstream companies.

== Economies of scale ==
OEMs rely on their ability to drive down the cost of production through economies of scale. Using an OEM also allows the purchasing company to obtain needed components or products without owning and operating a factory.

== See also ==
- Contract manufacturer
- Electronics manufacturing services
- Open-design movement
- Open-source hardware
- Original brand manufacturer
- Original design manufacturer
- Outsourcing
- Private label
- Rebranding
- Secondary market
- White-label product
