= Original design manufacturer =

Company that manufactures product rebranded by another firm for sale

An original design manufacturer (ODM) is a company that designs and manufactures a product for another company (its customer) to sell; this is in contrast to an original equipment manufacturer (OEM) which manufactures a product to the specifications of its customer or an original brand manufacturer (OBM) which designs and manufactures its own products. Some ODMs begin as OEMs and eventually become OBMs. Some manufacturers may fit multiple categories, with a portion of revenue attributable to each kind of work.

== Examples ==
- Foxconn, Inventec, Quanta Computer, and Wistron were named by Nvidia as ODM partners using its HGX reference architecture and design guidelines in 2017.
- Nokia (HMD) relies on ODMs for its post-2016 phones; in late 2019, it switched from relying on only one ODM to multiple ODMs.
- Samsung designs and manufactures some OEM-used SSDs and DIMMs, and such SSDs and DIMMs are rebranded by upstream companies such as Dell.
- MSI designs and manufactures some NVIDIA based graphics cards, and such graphics cards are rebranded by upstream companies such as Dell.
- ZOTAC designs and manufactures some NVIDIA based graphics cards, and such graphics cards are rebranded by upstream companies such as Lenovo.
- Vestel designs and manufactures televisions and home appliances for various companies and adds their brand names to the products, then ships to the clients's distribution hubs who then deal with retail logistics and selling to the public.

== Intellectual property ==
ODMs create their own intellectual property and patent it. Most of their patents are filed in the US, China, and Taiwan. In 2020, all of the top ten electronics ODMs in the world (by revenue) were Taiwanese. When it comes to intellectual property, design's legal status under intellectual property law has remained unstable for three centuries, shifting between patents and copyright. Many original design manufacturers have what are called ODM agreements. In an agreement, unless one explicitly purchases the IP, the manufacturer retains it. This means they can sell the same product to competitors. Real-world examples include Apple and Samsung, when Apple at one time relied on Samsung for component manufacturing, until Samsung started launching its own smartphone. After years of court battles and huge amounts of money paid in damages, many learned that it is better to define IP boundaries.

== See also ==
- Electronics manufacturing services
- Original brand manufacturer
- Original equipment manufacturer
- Contract manufacturer
