= Microsoft Research Songsmith =

Music software

- Microsoft Research Songsmith
- Original author: Microsoft Research
- Developer: Microsoft Research
- Stable release: 1.03 / September 2012
- Written in: C# and C++
- Operating system: Microsoft Windows
- Platform: .NET Framework
- Size: 100MB download
- Available in: English
- Type: Music Software
- License: Proprietary
- Website: Songsmith

Microsoft Research Songsmith is a musical accompaniment application for Microsoft Windows, launched in early 2009. Songsmith immediately generates a musical accompaniment after a voice is recorded. The user can adjust tempo, genre (such as pop, R&B, hip-hop, rock, jazz, or reggae), and overall mood (e.g. to make it happy, sad, jazzy, etc.).

The software was developed by a team at Microsoft Research, led by researchers Dan Morris and Sumit Basu. The product began as a research project called MySong, conducted at Microsoft Research in collaboration with a University of Washington student, Ian Simon, in the summer of 2007. Songsmith is the second commercial project from Microsoft's Microsoft Research, after AutoCollage.

Morris and Basu starred in an infomercial that became a viral video. The video was featured on the Australian ABC TV program The Gruen Transfer as a competitor for the Worst Ad Ever.

The release of the software spawned an internet meme where the vocal tracks of popular songs are fed into the program.
