= AutoCollage 2008 =

- Developer: Microsoft Research
- Release: September 4, 2008
- Operating system: Microsoft Windows
- Type: Graphics software
- License: Microsoft EULA
- Website: AutoCollage 2008

AutoCollage 2008 is a Microsoft photomontage desktop application. The software creates a collage of representative elements from a set of images. It is able to detect faces and recognize objects.

The software was developed by Microsoft Research labs in Cambridge, England and launched on September 4, 2008.

== Versions ==
An update, named Microsoft Research AutoCollage 2008 version 1.1, was released in February 2009. The software update adds the ability to select images for the AutoCollage, a richer integration with Windows Live Photo Gallery, support for network folders and the ability to define custom output sizes.

A new version, named Microsoft Research AutoCollage Touch 2009, was released in September 2009, and included by some OEMs on machines with Windows 7.

== See also ==
- AndreaMosaic
