= AndreaMosaic =

Graphic art freeware

- Developer: Andrea Denzler
- Stable release: AndreaMosaic 3.54.0 / September 14, 2025; 4 months ago
- Preview release: AndreaMosaic 3.53.5 Beta / June 12, 2025; 7 months ago
- Written in: C++, Assembly language
- Operating system: Microsoft Windows, Mac OS X, Linux
- Available in: English, Русский, Spanish, French, Italian, Dutch, Chinese, German
- Type: Graphic art software
- License: Proprietary
- Website: www.andreaplanet.com/andreamosaic

AndreaMosaic is freeware graphic art software developed and published by Andrea Denzler and that specializes in the creation of photographic mosaic images.

== History ==
The first public release was version 3.12 in 2003. In the following years new features where added once or twice a year. A completely new interface came out of beta testing with version 3.3 in September 2008.

== Features ==
AndreaMosaic includes several features for creating mosaics. Together with the standard parameters necessary to create a mosaic the following features are available:

- On-the-fly creation of image variants
- Automatic cropping of images to fit the tile aspect ratio
- Automatic color adjustment
- Prevention of close duplicates
- High-resolution mosaics (up to 100 gigapixel)

== Versions ==
As of version 3.32 AndreaMosaic is available in Standard and Professional versions. Both share the same features but the Professional version exceeds the Standard version's limits of 200 megapixels and 30,000 tiles. AndreaMosaic is supported on Windows 98, Windows ME, Windows NT, Windows 2000, Windows XP, Windows Vista, Windows 2003 and also on Mac OS X and Linux distributions through the free Wine software. The software can be installed using the standard installer or through a fully portable no-install archive. A collection of 500 sample images is freely available.

== License ==
The license allows free use of the software, including commercial use, but it requires that every published or printed photographic mosaic, or derivative work, includes a reference to AndreaMosaic. Also the publishing or display to a large audience of a particular mosaic should be added to the public list of artworks created with AndreaMosaic.

== Artworks ==
Artworks was created worldwide using AndreaMosaic including

- a giant mosaic at the official Danish contribution to the 11th International Architecture Exhibition, Venice Biennale (credits)
- a mosaic in the short movie Fight for Beauty at the 52nd International Art Exhibition, Venice Biennale

== Reception ==
Although the software has proved popular and has some powerful features, it has been criticised for not being user-friendly with a confusing and dull interface featuring atrocious grammar but providing an excellent user guide and producing excellent results.
