= Uniloc USA, Inc. v. Microsoft Corp. =

2011 American patent lawsuit

Uniloc USA Inc. v. Microsoft Corp.
- Court: United States Court of Appeals for the Federal Circuit
- Full case name: Uniloc USA Inc. v. Microsoft Corp.
- Decided: January 4, 2011
- Citations: 632 F.3d 1292; 98 U.S.P.Q.2d 1203

Case history
- Prior history: 447 F. Supp. 2d 177 (D.R.I. 2006); No. 03-440 (D.R.I. Oct. 19, 2007); 290 Fed. Appx. 337 (Fed. Cir. 2008); 640 F. Supp. 2d 150 (D.R.I. 2009)
- Subsequent history: Rehearing denied, March 22, 2011.

Court membership
- Judges sitting: Randall Ray Rader, Richard Linn, Kimberly Ann Moore

Case opinions
- Majority: Linn, joined by a unanimous panel

Keywords
- Patent infringement under United States law

Uniloc USA, Inc. v. Microsoft Corp., 632 F.3d 1292 (Fed. Cir. 2011), was a patent lawsuit originally filed in the U.S. District Court for the District of Rhode Island.

Both Uniloc and Microsoft utilized a product registration software intended to reduce unauthorized copying of software. At the district court level, the court granted summary judgement of non-infringement by Microsoft of Uniloc's patent. The court's ruling was appealed to the United States Court of Appeals for the Federal Circuit, which reversed and remanded the decision. In the remanded district court case, the jury returned a verdict of infringement, finding Microsoft's infringement to be willful, and rewarding Uniloc $388 million in damages. However the district court granted a new trial on infringement and willfulness as well as other motions following post trial motions. In response, Uniloc appealed once again.

The United States Court of Appeals for the Federal Circuit reversed the new trial on infringement, but affirmed that Uniloc lacked evidence to prove willfulness and granted a new trial on damage costs. In this decision, the Federal Circuit shifted precedent and rejected the previously widely used "25 percent rule of thumb" in calculating patent damage awards.

In March 2012, Uniloc and Microsoft reached a "final and mutually agreeable resolution", the terms of which were not disclosed.

== Background ==
Uniloc is a computer security and copy protection software company. Founded in 1992, their technology is based on a patent granted to Ric Richardson and develops "try and buy" software distributed via magazines and preinstalled on new computers. The particular patent in question is the '216 patent (U.S. Patent No. 5,490,216) which is a software registration system that deters copying of software onto other computers. Uniloc argued that its patent was infringed by Microsoft's Product Activation feature.

Microsoft's Product Activation feature serves as a gatekeeper for a variety of Windows operating systems and Microsoft Office products. In this product, users must enter a 25-character alphanumeric product key. The software then forms a Product ID based on the software, and Hardware ID generated from computer information as well. Once Product Activation is initiated, a digital license request is sent to Microsoft over the internet. At this remote location, information is entered either into an MD5 message digest algorithm for Office products or an SHA-1 algorithm for Windows products.

Both pieces of software prevent "casual copying" of software in which users install copies of a program onto multiple computers, violating software license conditions. The algorithms used by Microsoft in their product activation software were alleged to infringe Uniloc's patent.

== Original District Court opinion and appeal ==
In 2007, judge William E. Smith of the District Court ruled in favor of Microsoft. In reaching this decision, the court first issued a claim construction ruling, resulting in several terms that contributed to the instant appeal. The terms include definitions of "registration system", "licensee unique ID", and "algorithm". The 2007 ruling concluded that Microsoft's algorithm to generate a licensee unique ID was not identical to the parallel algorithm in Uniloc's user's local station.

Uniloc appealed the decision of the district court, and a judgment was delivered by the Federal Circuit Court of Appeals in 2008, reversing and remanding the conclusion of non-infringement. According to the court, Uniloc put forth "extensive and by no means conclusory" evidence that the same algorithm was used at the local and remote sites of Microsoft and Uniloc, therefore concluding this determination should have gone to the jury.

== Remanded opinion and appeal ==
The jury returned a verdict of infringement of the '216 patent following a full trial and awarded Uniloc $388 million in damages. The court noted the jury's award was "the fifth largest patent verdict in history." The decision against Microsoft was subsequently overturned on September 29, 2009 when judge William E. Smith "vacated" the jury's verdict, ruling in Microsoft's favor once again. However, the district court, following post trial motions, granted a new trial on infringement and willfulness in infringement. Additionally, the district court granted Judgement as a matter of law (JMOL) of non-infringement on a few bases, granted JMOL of no willfulness, and granted a new trial on damages. In response, Uniloc appealed all but the denial of JMOL of invalidity.

The United States Court of Appeals for the Federal Circuit reversed the grant of JMOL of non-infringement and new trial on infringement, but affirmed the grant of JMOL of no willfulness and a new trial on damages.

=== Infringement ===
The case for infringement, according to the Federal Circuit of Appeals rested on three primary issues.

1. whether Microsoft's software contains "licensee unique ID generating means" as defined in patent 216
2. whether Microsoft's software contains a "registration system" with a "mode switching means"
3. whether Microsoft can be liable for direct infringement when the software is run on the user's computer

Based on expert testimony at the district level, the court found that the Microsoft's accused product indeed matched close enough in algorithm to deem that infringement had occurred. Similarly, they found that the '216 patent sufficiently encompassed the methods used in Microsoft's Product Activation. Finally, the Federal Circuit determined, based on precedent, that although the program is run on an end user's computer, the fact that "other parties are necessary to complete the environment... does not necessarily divide the infringement between the necessary parties," thus rejecting all three cruxes on the case for infringement.

=== JMOL and new trial for willfullness ===
The Federal Circuit determined that Uniloc had not presented any evidence demonstrating that Microsoft knew that the algorithms it used infringed on the '216 patent. Because of the complex issues involved in the definition of terms in the patent, it was found unreasonable that Microsoft knowingly infringed on the patent, affirming the grant of JMOL of no willfulness and therefore no need to grant a new trial on willfulness.

=== New trial on damages ===
The "25 percent rule of thumb" called for a 25 percent royalty rate when calculating patent infringement damages in cases exactly like those in Uniloc and Microsoft's case. When Microsoft had challenged the 25 percent rule, the district court acknowledged the complexity of using the automatic 25 percent royalty in this case, but rejected Microsoft's position because of how widely accepted the rule had been. However, the Federal Circuit noted that it is subject to criticism on three points:

1. it fails to account for the unique relationship between the patents and the accused products;
2. it fails to account for the unique relationship between the parties;
3. the rule is essentially arbitrary and does not fit within the model of the hypothetical negotiation within which it is based.

Citing decisions in Lucent v. Gateway and other cases, the Circuit stated that

- "[t]he entire market value rule allows a patentee to assess damages based on the entire market value of the accused product only where the patented feature creates the "basis for customer demand" or "substantially create[s] the value of the component parts."
- "there must be a basis in fact to associate the royalty rates used in prior licenses to the... negotiation at issue in the case."

The 25 percent rule fails to do so and cannot be used blindly as it says nothing about a particular negotiation nor the particular technology, industry, or party; the court then noted "the danger of admitting consideration of the entire market value of the accused where the patented component does not create the basis for customer demand", as seen in this case.

== Implications ==
One potentially lasting aspect to this case is the court's rejection of the 25 percent rule, finding it "fundamentally flawed". This rule suggested royalty rates for patent infringement awards should equal 25 percent of the profits that could be expected from products that utilized the intellectual property contained in an infringed patent. The effects of rejecting the 25 percent rule precedence would be felt across all industries where patents are utilized to protect intellectual property. The rejection of the 25 percent rule underscores the importance of using facts of a particular case in calculating damages owed. Despite being widely accepted prior to this court decision, the 25 percent rule's rejection will likely lead to new trials on damages from previous lawsuits. Further, it has been acknowledged that without the 25 percent rule, royalty rates awarded in court will decrease. As was noted by expert testimony in the case as well, industry standard royalty rates are rarely ever as much as 25 percent.

== See also ==
- Alcatel-Lucent v. Microsoft, another patent infringement case involving Microsoft
- Markman v. Westview Instruments, Inc., another case that used claims interpretation/construction resolved in the court
