= License borrowing =

License borrowing is a feature that allows a user to run software on a computer that is not continuously connected to the license server on the network.

When making a borrow request, the user is either connected to the server over the network, or with some systems the license can be borrowed via secure file exchange between the disconnected user's system and the server. After the license has been borrowed, the user can then disconnect the computer from the network and continue to use the software for the length of the borrow period, which is typically determined by the software vendor. During this time, the borrowed license is removed from the pool of available licenses. After the borrow period expires the license is then checked back into the pool.

== See also ==
- Floating licensing
- License manager
