= Uniloc =

Australian software company

Uniloc Corporation
- Type: Private
- Industry: Software licensing Patent holding
- Founded: 1992
- Founder: Ric Richardson
- Headquarters: Australia
- Area served: Worldwide
- Products: Software activation Licensing technologies
- Services: Patent licensing Litigation
- Subsidiaries: Uniloc USA; Uniloc PC Preload

Uniloc Corporation is a company founded in Australia in 1992. Originally focused on software licensing and activation tools, in the 2000s the company became known for aggressive patent litigation against software companies.

== History ==
The Uniloc technology is based on a patent granted to the inventor Ric Richardson who was also the founder of the Uniloc Company. The original patent application was dated late 1992 in Australia and granted in the US in 1996 and covers a technology popularly known as product activation, try and buy software and machine locking.

In 1993 Uniloc distributed "Try and Buy" versions of software for multiple publishers via a marketing agreement with IBM. An initial success was the sale of thousands of copies of a software package (First Aid, developed by Cybermedia) distributed on the front cover of Windows Sources magazine in 1994.

In 1997 a US subsidiary was set up called Uniloc PC Preload to produce preloaded unlockable editions of popular software products on new PCs. Distribution agreements were executed with eMachines and Toshiba. Family PC magazine also produced two months of magazines featuring unlockable software from Uniloc PC Preload on the cover in 2000.

In 2003, Uniloc Corporation set up a US subsidiary called Uniloc USA, which operates out of Rhode Island and Southern California. As of 2009, the company licensed its patented technology to software publishers and entertainment companies including Sega.

== Patent lawsuits ==
As of 2010, Uniloc had sued 73 companies that it alleges have violated one of its copy-protection patents. According to Uniloc, 25 of those companies settled with it out of court. Due to the abstract nature of its patents, and its litigious activities, Uniloc has been deemed a "patent troll" by critics.

=== Microsoft ===
Uniloc sued Microsoft in 2003 for violating its patent relating to technology designed to deter software piracy. In 2006, US District Judge William Smith ruled in favour of Microsoft, but an appeals court overturned his decision, saying there was a "genuine issue of material fact" and that he should not have ruled on the case without hearing from a jury. On April 8, 2009 a Rhode Island jury found Microsoft had violated the patent and told Microsoft to pay Uniloc $388 million in damages. After this success, Uniloc filed new patent infringement suits against Sony America, McAfee, Activision, Quark, Borland Software and Aspyr Media.

The decision against Microsoft was subsequently overturned on September 29, 2009, when Judge Smith vacated the jury's verdict and ruled in favour of Microsoft again, saying the jury "lacked a grasp of the issues before it and reached a finding without a legally sufficient basis". Uniloc appealed the judge's decision, alleging bias and in 2011 the jury verdict was reinstated against Microsoft. The US Court of Appeals for the Federal Circuit said that instead of using the usual "25 percent rule", the damage awards for infringement would need to be recalculated.

In March 2012, Uniloc and Microsoft reached a "final and mutually agreeable resolution", the terms of which were not disclosed.

=== Minecraft and other games ===
On July 20, 2012, Uniloc filed a lawsuit against Mojang, citing the Minecraft Pocket Edition, as an infringement upon patents claiming exclusive rights to a method of software license checking. Markus Persson of Mojang has stated he does not believe Minecraft infringes the Uniloc US patent no. 6,857,067 and that Mojang AB will defend the lawsuit. The same lawsuit was also filed against other Android game developers including Electronic Arts (maker of Bejeweled 2), Laminar Research (maker of X-Plane), Distinctive Developments, Gameloft, Halfbrick Studios, Madfinger Games and Square Enix. The patents involved was partly invalided in 2014.
