= Floating licensing =

Software license activation technique

Floating licensing, also known as concurrent licensing or network licensing, is a software licensing approach in which a limited number of licenses for a software application are shared among a larger number of users over time. When an authorized user wishes to run the application, they request a license from a central license server. If a license is available, the license server allows the application to run. When they finish using the application, or when the allowed license period expires, the license is reclaimed by the license server and made available to other authorized users.

The license server can manage licenses over a local area network, an intranet, virtual private network, or the Internet.

Floating licensing is often used for high-value applications in corporate environments; such as electronic design automation or engineering tools. However, its use is broadly expanding throughout the software industry.

An on-premise license server used to be the only way to enforce floating licensing models. A license server was required at each end user's location and each computer or device in a network needed to connect to it. License files would be bound to the host ID of the license server but could be made available to any client computer in the network; with the concurrent user limit enforced by the on-premise license server. License files are usually tied to the host ID of the license server by a MAC address or Ethernet address. The number of licenses registered and installed on the license server limits the number of concurrent users.

Although on-premise license servers are the traditional method of implementing floating licensing, modern solutions make use of cloud-based and plug and play solutions.

== See also ==
- Concurrent user
- Software metering
- License manager
- License borrowing
- Node-locked licensing
- Software license server
