= Software license manager =

Software management tool

A software license manager is a software management tool used by independent software vendors or by end-user organizations to control where and how software products are able to run. License managers protect software vendors from losses due to software piracy and enable end-user organizations to comply with software license agreements. License managers enable software vendors to offer a wide range of usage-centric software licensing models, such as product activation, trial licenses, subscription licenses, feature-based licenses, and floating licensing from the same software package they provide to all users.

A license manager is different from a software asset management tool, which end-user organizations employ to manage the software they have licensed from many software vendors. However, some software asset management tools include license manager functions. These are used to reconcile software licenses and installed software, and generally include device discovery, software inventory, license compliance, and reporting functions.

An additional benefit of these software management tools are that they reduce the difficulty, cost, and time required for reporting and can increase operational transparency in order to prevent litigation costs associated with software misuse, as set forth by the Sarbanes-Oxley Act.

License management solutions provided by non-vendor companies are more valuable to the end-users, since most vendors do not provide enough license usage information. A vendor license manager provides limited information, while non-vendor license management solutions are developed for end-users in order to maximally optimize the licenses they have.

Most license managers can cover different software licensing models as license dongles or license USB keys, floating licenses, network licenses, concurrent license etc.
