= Product activation =

Software license validation procedure

Product activation is a license validation procedure required by some proprietary software programs. Product activation prevents unlimited free use of copied or replicated software. Unactivated software refuses to fully function until it determines whether it is authorized to fully function. Activation allows the software to stop blocking its use. An activation can last "forever", or it can have a time limit, requiring a renewal or re-activation for continued use. Product activation is often based on verification of a product key, which is a sequence of letters and/or numbers that is verified via an algorithm or mathematical formula, for a particular solution or set of solutions, possibly combined with verification in a database or some other method for verification which can be done via the internet. If the solution matches expectations, and verification confirms that the product key is genuine, the product is activated. Using hashing, it is possible to represent letters as numbers before verification.

== Implementations ==
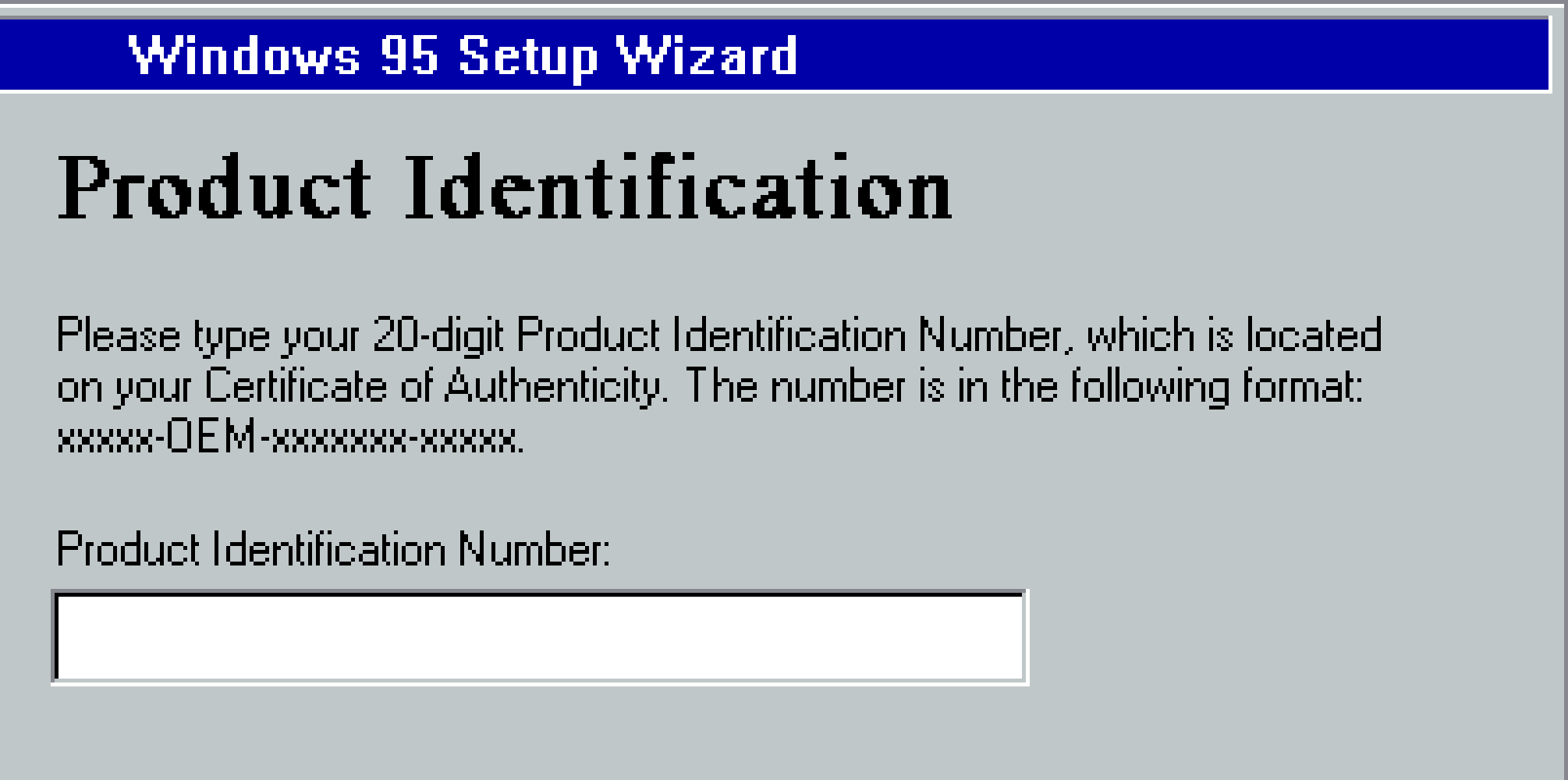
A product key is required to proceed and use Windows 95

In one form, product activation refers to a method invented by Ric Richardson and patented (U.S. patent 5,490,216) by Uniloc where a software application hashes hardware serial numbers and an ID number specific to the product's license (a product key) to generate a unique installation ID. This installation ID is sent to the manufacturer to verify the authenticity of the product key and to ensure that the product key is not being used for multiple installations.

Alternatively, the software vendor sends the user a unique product serial number. When the user installs the application it requests that the user enter their product serial number, and checks it with the vendor's systems over the Internet. The application obtains the license limits that apply to that user's license, such as a time limit or enabling of product features, from the vendor's system and optionally also locks the license to the user's system. Once activated the license continues working on the user's machine with no further communication required with the vendor's systems. Some activation systems also support activation on user systems without Internet connections; a common approach is to exchange encrypted files at an Internet terminal.

An early example of product activation was in the MS-DOS program D'Bridge Email System written by Chris Irwin, a commercial network system for BBS users and Fidonet. The program generated a unique serial number which then called the author's BBS via a dialup modem connection. Upon connection, the serial number was validated. A unique "key" was returned which allowed the program to continue for a trial period. If two D'Bridge systems communicated using the same key, the software deliberately crashed. The software has long since had the entire activation system removed and is now freeware by Nick J. Andre, Ltd.

=== Microsoft ===
Microsoft Product Activation was introduced in the Brazilian version of Microsoft Office 97 Small Business Edition and Microsoft Word 97 sold in the Hungarian market. It broadened that successful pilot with the release of Microsoft Publisher 98 in the Brazilian market. Microsoft then rolled out product activation in its flagship Microsoft Office 2000 product. All retail copies sold in Australia, Brazil, China, France, and New Zealand, and some sold in Canada and the United States, required the user to activate the product via the Internet. However, all copies of Office 2000 do not require activation after April 15, 2003. After its success, the product activation system was extended worldwide and incorporated into Windows XP and Office XP and all subsequent versions of Windows and Office. Despite independently developing its own technology, in April 2009 a jury found Microsoft to have willfully infringed Uniloc's patent. However, in September 2009, US District Judge William Smith "vacated" the jury's verdict and ruled in favour of Microsoft. This ruling was subsequently overturned in 2011.

== Blocking ==
Software that has been installed but not activated does not perform its full functions, and/or imposes limits on file size or session time. Some software allows full functionality for a limited "trial" time before requiring activation. Unactivated software typically reminds the user to activate, at program startup or at intervals, and when the imposed size or time limits are reached. (Some unactivated software has taken disruptive actions such as crashing or vandalism, but this is rare.)

Some 'unactivated' products act as a time-limited trial until a product key—a number encoded as a sequence of alphanumeric characters—is purchased and used to activate the software. Some products allow licenses to be transferred from one machine to another using online tools, without having to call technical support to deactivate the copy on the old machine before reactivating it on the new machine.

Software verifies activation every time it starts up, and sometimes while it is running. Some software even "phones home", checking a central database (across the Internet or other means) to check whether the specific activation has been revoked. Some software might stop working or reduce functionality if it cannot connect to the central database.

== Criticisms ==
- It can enforce software license agreement restrictions that may be legally invalid. For example, a company may refuse to reactivate software on an upgraded or new PC, even if the user may have a legal right to use the product under such circumstances.
- If the company ceases to support a specific product, goes out of business due to insolvency or consolidation, its purchased product may become unusable or incapable of being (re)installed unless an activation-free copy or final patch that removes or bypasses activation is released.
- Product activation where there is no straightforward way to transfer the license to another person to activate on their computer has been widely criticised as making second-hand sales of products, particularly games, very difficult. Some suspect companies such as EA to be using product activation to reduce second-hand sales of their games in order to increase sales of new copies.
- As the transfer of an activation request usually happens encrypted or at least obfuscated, the user cannot see or check if additional data from his/her machine gets transferred, creating privacy concerns.
- Malfunction of the activating mechanism can delay users from getting started using newly licensed software.
- Malfunction of the verification mechanism can cause vital software to suddenly stop working until re-activated or patched. This can happen in response to detected changes of installed hardware, or other software, of the operating system.

== See also ==
- Digital rights management
- Dongle
- Technical support
