= SOS Online Backup =

Multinational American company providing offline backup services

- Developer: SOS Online Backup
- Release: 2001
- Stable release: 6.7.2 (January 18, 2017; 9 years ago) [±]
- Operating system: Windows 7 or later; OS X 10.8 or later; Android; iOS
- Available in: English
- Type: Online backup service
- License: Commercial proprietary software (with a so-called "Free Trial" that is actually non-free)
- Website: sosonlinebackup.com

SOS Online Backup is an online backup company based in El Segundo, California.

== History ==
Founded in 2001 the company is headquartered in El Segundo, California, and has offices in Australia, India, and Ukraine. It has twelve datacenters around the world including six in the United States, with others in Canada, Australia, United Kingdom, India, Ukraine and South Africa.

In 2012 the company changed its name to Infrascale, Inc. - and SOS Online Backup became the name of their cloud backup product line they sell to small businesses.

The SOS Online Backup product is an integrated local and online backup tool that allows users to back up their data to an off-site location. It has versions for consumers, SMBs and resellers. The program works primarily on Windows operating systems, but there are also backup clients for iPhone, iPad, BlackBerry OS, macOS and Facebook.

The program received awards from various consumer focussed publications, such as Notebookreview.com, and was a PC Magazine Editors Choice in 2006, 2008, 2010 and 2011. The New York Times recommended the program in its article about "easy ways to improve your computer life".

== Features ==
Features include continuous data protection, unlimited versioning, archiving, integrated local backup, and military-grade security. It is available as both a paid version, and a free version with limited capacity.

On October 13, 2011, they announced a cloud-based backup service for mobile devices, desktop systems and Facebook.

== Product Editions ==
SOS Online Backup comes in two versions:

1. SOS Online Backup for Home - The home version comes with 50 GB, 100 GB and 150 GB, with a subscription ranging from 1–3 years and users may backup up to five computers with a single account.
2. SOS Online Backup for Business - The business version starts at 10 GB storage size and may be upgraded up to any limit of storage with a subscription ranging from 1–3 years and users may backup any number of computers with a single account. Supports network backup can back up multiple computers, servers or Network Attached Storage appliances on a local area network from a single computer or device and also offers Centralized Management. The business version comes with an ultra safe option which prevents customers data access by the staff but password cannot be retrieved by any means in case of password lost.

Infrascale also offers variations of its cloud backup technology to partners, and focuses heavily on selling through resellers and managed service providers. Infrascale markets several other cloud-storage products, including FileLocker (a cloud file-sharing product) and EndGuard (an enterprise endpoint backup product).

The SOS Business product, which Infrascale markets to partners and to business users includes several features targeted at protecting server-based data such as:

1. Exchange Backup and Granular Recovery
2. Windows Server Backup and Recovery
3. SharePoint Server Backup and Recovery
4. SQL Server Backup and Recovery

== See also ==
- List of online backup services
- Comparison of online backup services
- Remote backup service
- List of backup software
