= NovaStor =

American software company

- Industry: Software
- Founded: 1987
- Headquarters: Agoura Hills, Los Angeles County, California, USA
- Area served: Hamburg, Germany; Zug, Switzerland
- Products: Backup and recovery software
- Website: novastor.com

NovaStor is a privately held software company based in Agoura Hills, California, with offices in Hamburg, Germany, and Zug, Switzerland.

The company's primary focus is providing backup and recovery software to home users, small- and medium-sized businesses, and enterprises. NovaStor and its products are often compared to other backup and data protection services, such as Symantec and EMC.

== History ==
NovaStor was founded in 1987. In June 2009, it was bought out by a management-led investor group, which remains as the company's majority shareholder.

== Products ==
NovaStor provides backup and recovery software for home users, businesses, and managed service providers. Their core focus is cloud and enterprise services, which provide technology for onsite and offsite backup and the deployment of cloud-based managed services.

NovaStor product features include:

- PC and server backup and restore
- Local and offsite backup and restore
- Tape and disk imaging software
- Disaster recovery
- Virtualization
- Cloud storage backup enablement
- Hard drive recovery and disk booting

== See also ==
- List of backup software
- Technology companies based in the Greater Los Angeles Area
