= Fuzzy backup =

A fuzzy backup is a secondary (or backup) copy of data file(s) or directories that were in one state when the backup started, but in a different state by the time the backup completed. This may result in the backup copy being unusable because of the data inconsistencies. Although the backup process might have seemed successful, the resultant copies of the files or directories could be useless because a restore would yield inconsistent and unusable data.
