= MiRoamer =

miRoamer
- Type: Digital Media Platform
- Headquarters: Melbourne, Victoria, Australia
- Key people: George Parthimos, Managing Director and Chief Executive Officer Chris Dimopoulos, Technology Group Team Leader & Head of Development
- Parent: Mi Media Holdings

MiRoamer, formerly Torian Wireless, is a digital media platform designed and built by Mi Media Holdings to deliver its collection of internet media in the way regardless of the platform or product.

== Products ==
MiRoamer Internet Car Radio: miRoamer and Blaupunkt introduced the purpose-built internet car radio with access to the diverse selection of Internet media content in 2009. The new devices are the New Jersey 600i and the Hamburg 600i. The product of this alliance is the world's first in-car Internet radio. It was unveiled at the Computer Electronics Show in Las Vegas.The device, which adds Internet access to conventional AM and M tuners, will give mobile access to the thousands of internet radio stations now operating around the globe. The enabling technology built into the radios was developed in Melbourne by miRoamer, formerly Torian Wireless, of Doncaster. It connects to the Internet through a 3G mobile phone network, utilizing a dedicated SIM card in the car radio or by using a mobile phone as a modem to feed data to the Internet browser built into the car's radio software. The prototype head unit connects to a cellphone over Bluetooth to access the Internet, and uses the miRoamer service to stream thousands of stations on the service—which the company estimates will consume about 2GB of data a month. Because so many radio stations that are available, the interface in the head unit isn't designed for users to search through stations. Instead, users create a profile on the miRoamer website with their favorite radio stations. When they get in the car, the head unit logs into miRoamer and shows their radio stations as presets.

MiRoamer Platinum is a Mi Media product created in 2010. miRoamer Platinum allows for a customised 'radio' experience through 'live' media streaming. The fundamentals of miRoamer Platinum lies in its music/content/song programming where the selection of songs have been compiled into 30 pre-packaged stations. The improved miRoamer Platinum is expected to launch in early 2010. All stations are arranged and customizable, offering a tailored OEM and distributor solution with the upcoming launch of miRoamer Platinum.
