= Continuity planning =

Continuity planning may refer to:

- Business continuity planning
- IT service continuity planning
