= GreatAmerica =

Financial services company

- Type: Private
- Industry: Financial services
- Founded: 1992
- Headquarters: Cedar Rapids, Iowa, USA
- Number of locations: Marshall, Minnesota; Milton, Georgia; Northbrook, Illinois; Des Moines, Iowa
- Key people: Tony Golobic, Executive Chairman; Martin Golobic, CEO
- Number of employees: 730+ (2023)
- Website: www.greatamerica.com

GreatAmerica, legally GreatAmerica Holdings, Inc., is a national commercial equipment finance company that provides financing and consulting services in the United States, and some of the U.S. Territories.

== History ==
The company was founded in 1990. In 1992, the company relocated from Michigan to Cedar Rapids, Iowa and became GreatAmerica Leasing Corporation. At that time, there were only four employees, which included founder Anton (Tony) Golobic, his wife Magda, and two others. In November 2012, the company adopted the new trade name GreatAmerica Financial Services Corporation.

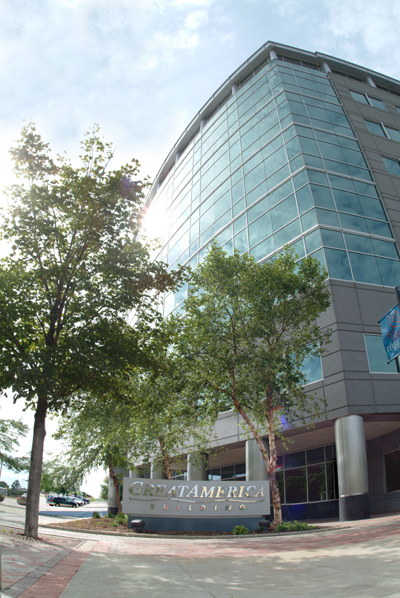
Façade of GreatAmerica Building in Cedar Rapids

GreatAmerica is the largest independent, family-owned national commercial equipment finance company in the U.S. and is dedicated to helping manufacturers, vendors, and dealers be more successful and keep their customers for a lifetime. A $3 billion company with life-to-date finance originations of $16.9 billion in the office equipment, communications, light industrial, information technology, automotive service and repair, and franchise industries. In addition to financing, GreatAmerica offers non-financial services under its Platform Services division, which includes GreatAmerica Portfolio Services.

In 2004, an investment group including GreatAmerica Leasing Corporation and CEO Tony Golobic purchased the GreatAmerica Building for $16 million. During the Flood of 2008, the company activated their disaster recovery plan and relocated staff and resources to pre-arranged recovery sites. Staff did not return to the GreatAmerica building in downtown Cedar Rapids for 68 days.

In late 2009, GreatAmerica Leasing Corporation surpassed $1 billion in assets.

In 2009 GreatAmerica launched the Master Managed Services Provider subsidiary company, Collabrance LLC, as a value-add service to their Strategic Solutions Group.

In June 2011, the company purchased the GreatAmerica building from River Cedar Properties LLC for $22.5 Million

In November, 2017, GreatAmerica announced that it surpassed the $2 billion mark in assets and concurrently reached its 25th year of uninterrupted organic growth.

In 2022, GreatAmerica expanded its presence in the franchise financing business by acquiring Illinois-based IRH Capital LLC, a 20-year veteran in the franchise financing industry.

In August 2024, GreatAmerica sold Master MSP, Collabrance LLC, to The 20. The20 retained the Collabrance brand and all Collabrance employees.

In June 2026, parent company GreatAmerica Holdings, Inc. completed its acquisition of Heritage Bank, an Iowa state-chartered bank headquartered in Marion, Iowa. The bank was relaunched as GreatAmerica Bank, National Association after receiving a national bank charter.

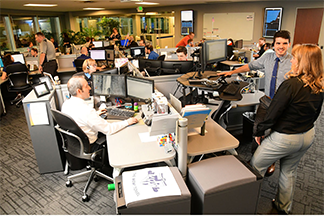
Photo of IT Support, inside GreatAmerica
