= ISCP =

ISCP may refer to:

- International Studio & Curatorial Program
- International State College of the Philippines
- Information System Contingency Plan - plan for re-establishing an information system service after disruption
- Islamic State – Caucasus Province
