= Remote backup service =

File hosting service

A remote, online, or managed backup service, sometimes marketed as cloud backup or backup-as-a-service, is a service that provides users with a system for the backup, storage, and recovery of computer files. Online backup providers are companies that provide this type of service to end users (or clients). Such backup services are considered a form of cloud computing.

Online backup systems are typically built for a client software program that runs on a given schedule. Some systems run once a day, usually at night while computers aren't in use. Other newer cloud backup services run continuously to capture changes to user systems nearly in real-time. The online backup system typically collects, compresses, encrypts, and transfers the data to the remote backup service provider's servers or off-site hardware.

There are many products on the market – all offering different feature sets, service levels, and types of encryption. Providers of this type of service frequently target specific market segments. High-end LAN-based backup systems may offer services such as Active Directory, client remote control, or open file backups. Consumer online backup companies frequently have beta software offerings and/or free-trial backup services with fewer live support options.

== History ==
In the mid-1980s, the computer industry was in a great state of change with modems at speeds of 1200 to 2400 baud, making transfers of large amounts of data slow (1 MB in 72 minutes). While faster modems and more secure network protocols were in development, tape backup systems gained in popularity. During that same period the need for an affordable, reliable online backup system was becoming clear, especially for businesses with critical data.

More online/remote backup services came into existence during the heyday of the dot-com boom in the late 1990s. The initial years of these large industry service providers were about capturing market share and understanding the importance and the role that these online backup providers were playing in the web services arena. Today, most service providers of online backup services position their services using the SaaS (software as a service) and PaaS (Platform as a service) strategy and its relevance is predicted to increase exponentially in the years to come as personal and enterprise data storage needs rise. The last few years have also witnessed a healthy rise in the number of independent online backup providers.

== Characteristics ==
=== Service-based ===
1. The assurance, guarantee, or validation that what was backed up is recoverable whenever it is required is critical. Data stored in the service provider's cloud must undergo regular integrity validation to ensure its recoverability.
2. Cloud BUR (BackUp & Restore) services need to provide a variety of granularity when it comes to RTO's (Recovery Time Objective). One size does not fit all either for the customers or the applications within a customer's environment.
3. The customer should never have to manage the back end storage repositories in order to back up and recover data.
4. The interface used by the customer needs to enable the selection of data to protect or recover, the establishment of retention times, destruction dates as well as scheduling.
5. Cloud backup needs to be an active process where data is collected from systems that store the original copy. This means that cloud backup will not require data to be copied into a specific appliance from where data is collected before being transmitted to and stored in the service provider's data centre.

=== Ubiquitous access ===
1. Cloud BUR utilizes standard networking protocols (which today are primarily but not exclusively IP based) to transfer data between the customer and the service provider.
2. Vaults or repositories need to be always available to restore data to any location connected to the Service Provider's Cloud via private or public networks.

=== Scalable and elastic ===
1. Cloud BUR enables flexible allocation of storage capacity to customers without limit. Storage is allocated on demand and also de-allocated as customers delete backup sets as they age.
2. Cloud BUR enables a Service Provider to allocate storage capacity to a customer. If that customer later deletes their data or no longer needs that capacity, the Service Provider can then release and reallocate that same capacity to a different customer in an automated fashion.

=== Metered by use ===
1. Cloud Backup allows customers to align the value of data with the cost of protecting it. It is procured on a per-gigabyte per month basis. Prices tend to vary based on the age of data, type of data (email, databases, files etc.), volume, number of backup copies and RTOs.

Cloud Backup operates on a native cloud multitenant platform, which is designed to share resources among users to increase data mobility. It is intended to reduce customer dependence on a single provider, allowing an individual to move their data to another provider or a dedicated Private or Hybrid Cloud. Service providers have safety measures designed to prevent customer data becoming accessible to other customers or the provider itself without explicit permission to do so.

=== Enterprise-class cloud backup ===
An enterprise-class cloud backup solution must include an on-premises cache, to mitigate any issues due to inconsistent Internet connectivity.

Hybrid cloud backup works by storing data to local disk so that the backup can be captured at high speed, and then either the backup software or a D2D2C (Disk to Disk to Cloud) appliance encrypts and transmits data to a service provider. This adds protection against local disasters. Recent backups are retained locally, to speed data recovery operations.

There are a number of cloud storage appliances on the market that can be used as a backup target, including appliances from CTERA Networks, StorSimple and TwinStrata.

Hybrid cloud backup is also beneficial for enterprise users who have security concerns. When storing data locally before sending it to the cloud, backup users can perform the necessary encryption operations, incl. technologies like:

- Data encryption cipher (AES 128, AES192, AES256 or blowfish)
- Windows Encrypting File System (EFS)
- Verification of files previously catalogued, permitting a Tripwire-like capability
- CRAM-MD5 password authentication between each component (storage, client and cloud)
- Configurable TLS (SSL) communications encryption between each component (storage, client and cloud)
- Computation of MD5 or SHA1 signatures of the file data, if configured

Data encryption should additionally be applied when you choose a public cloud service provider.

The same is important for the compression of backup data. The local backup cache is used to compress the data before sending it to the cloud in order to lower the network bandwidth load and improve backup speed. This becomes critical for enterprises which backup huge databases like Oracle or MS SQL or huge files like virtual machine images or mail server databases (EDB files of Exchange).

Recent improvements in CPU availability allow increased use of software agents instead of hardware appliances for enterprise cloud backup. The software-only approach can offer advantages including decreased complexity, simple scalability, significant cost savings and improved data recovery times.

== Typical features ==
Encryption
Data should be encrypted before it is sent across the internet, and it should be stored in its encrypted state. Encryption should be at least 256 bits, and the user should have the option of using his own encryption key, which should never be sent to the server.
Network backup
A backup service supporting network backup can back up multiple computers, servers or Network Attached Storage appliances on a local area network from a single computer or device.
Continuous backup – Continuous Data Protection
Allows the service to back up continuously or on a predefined schedule. Both methods have advantages and disadvantages. Most backup services are schedule-based and perform backups at a predetermined time. Some services provide continuous data backups which are used by large financial institutions and large online retailers. However, there is typically a trade-off with performance and system resources.
File-by-File Restore
The ability for users to restore files themselves, without the assistance of a Service Provider by allowing the user select files by name and/or folder. Some services allow users to select files by searching for filenames and folder names, by dates, by file type, by backup set, and by tags.
Online access to files
Some services allow you to access backed-up files via a normal web browser. Many services do not provide this type of functionality.
Data compression
Data will typically be compressed with a lossless compression algorithm to minimize the amount of bandwidth used.
Differential data compression
A way to further minimize network traffic is to transfer only the binary data that has changed from one day to the next, similar to the open source file transfer service Rsync. More advanced online backup services use this method rather than transfer entire files.
Bandwidth usage
User-selectable option to use more or less bandwidth; it may be possible to set this to change at various times of day.
Off-Line Backup
Off-Line Backup allows along with and as part of the online backup solution to cover daily backups in time when network connection is down. At this time the remote backup software must perform backup onto a local media device like a tape drive, a disk or another server. The minute network connection is restored remote backup software will update the remote datacenter with the changes coming out of the off-line backup media .
Synchronization
Many services support data synchronization allowing users to keep a consistent library of all their files across many computers. The technology can help productivity and increase access to data.

== Common features for business users ==
Bulk restore
A way to restore data from a portable storage device when a full restore over the Internet might take too long.
Centralized management console
Allows for an IT department or staff member to monitor and manage backups & restores for the regular user.
File retention policies
Many businesses require a flexible file retention policy that can be applied to an unlimited number of groups of files called "sets".
Fully managed services
Some services offer a higher level of support to businesses that might request immediate help, proactive monitoring, personal visits from their service provider, or telephone support.
Redundancy
Multiple copies of data backed up at different locations. This can be achieved by having two or more mirrored data centers, or by keeping a local copy of the latest version of backed up data on site with the business.
Regulatory compliance
Some businesses are required to comply with government regulations that govern privacy, disclosure, and legal discovery. A service provider that offers this type of service assists customers with proper compliance with and understanding of these laws.
Seed loading
Ability to send a first backup on a portable storage device rather than over the Internet when a user has large amounts of data that they need quickly backed up.
Server backup
Many businesses require backups of servers and the special applications or databases that run on them, such as groupware, SQL, ERP- or CRM-systems and directory services. This requires not only regular file-based approach, but specific point-in-time backups and restores for databases.

Versioning
Keeps multiple past versions of files to allow for rollback to or restoration from a specific point in time.

== Cost factors ==
Online backup services are usually priced as a function of the following things:

1. The total amount of data being backed up.
2. The total amount of data being restored.
3. The number of machines covered by the backup service.
4. The maximum number of versions of each file that are kept.
5. Data retention and archiving period options
6. Managed backups vs. Unmanaged backups
7. The level of service and features available

Some vendors limit the number of versions of a file that can be kept in the system. Some services omit this restriction and provide an unlimited number of versions. Add-on features (plug-ins), like the ability to back up currently open or locked files, are usually charged as an extra, but some services provide this built in.

Most remote backup services reduce the amount of data to be sent over the wire by only backing up changed files. This approach to backing up means that the customers total stored data is reduced. Reducing the amount of data sent and also stored can be further drastically reduced by only transmitting the changed data bits by binary or block level incremental backups. Solutions that transmit only these changed binary data bits do not waste bandwidth by transmitting the same file data over and over again if only small amounts change.

== Advantages ==
Remote backup has advantages over traditional backup methods:

- Remote backup does not require user intervention. The user does not have to change tapes, label CDs or perform other manual steps.
- Unlimited data retention (presuming the backup provider stays in business).
- Some remote backup services will work continuously, backing up files as they are changed.
- Most remote backup services will maintain a list of versions of your files.
- Most remote backup services will use a 128 – 2048 bit encryption to send data over unsecured links (e.g. internet).
- A few remote backup services can reduce backup by only transmitting changed data.
- Manage and secure digital data information.

== Disadvantages ==
Remote backup has some disadvantages over traditional backup methods:

- Depending on the available network bandwidth, the restoration of data can be slow. Because data is stored offsite, the data must be recovered either via the Internet or via a disk shipped from the online backup service provider.
- Some backup service providers have no guarantee that stored data will be kept private.
- It is possible that a remote backup service provider could go out of business or be purchased, which may affect the accessibility of one's data or the cost to continue using the service.
- If the encryption password is lost, data recovery will be impossible. However, with managed services this should not be a problem.
- Residential broadband services often have monthly limits that preclude large backups. They are also usually asymmetric; the user-to-network link regularly used to store backups is much slower than the network-to-user link used only when data is restored.
- In terms of price, when looking at the raw cost of hard disks, remote backups cost about 1-20 times per GB what a local backup would.

== Managed vs. unmanaged ==
Some services provide expert backup management services as part of the overall offering. These services typically include:

- Assistance configuring the initial backup
- Continuous monitoring of the backup processes on the client machines to ensure that backups actually happen
- Proactive alerting in the event that any backups fail
- Assistance in restoring and recovering data

== Scheduled vs. manual vs. event-based backup ==
There are three distinct types of backup modes: scheduled, manual and event-based.

- Scheduled Backup – data is backed up according to a fixed schedule.
- Manual Backup – backup of data is triggered by user input.
- Event-based Backup – backup of data is triggered by some computer events, e.g. database or application stoppage (cold backup).

== See also ==
- Attix5 Online Backup
- Cloud storage
- Comparison of backup software (includes managed backup providers)
- Comparison of file hosting services
- Comparison of file synchronization software
- Comparison of online backup services
- Comparison of online music lockers
- File hosting service
- File sharing
- List of backup software
- Off-site data protection – The practice of sending data off-site for safe keeping, but not necessarily using a remote backup service.
- Shared disk access
