= Staging =

Staging may refer to:

== Computing ==
- Staging (cloud computing), a process used to assemble, test, and review a new solution before it is moved into production and the existing solution is decommissioned
- Staging (data), intermediately storing data between the sources of information and a data warehouse (DW)
- Disk staging, using disks as an additional, temporary stage of backup process before finally storing backup
- Staging site, a website used to assemble, test, and review its newer versions before it is moved into production

== Other uses ==
- Staging (cooking), a chef works briefly and without pay in another chef's kitchen to learn new techniques and cuisines
- Staging (rocketry), the use of multiple engines and propellant to launch a rocket
- Staging (stagecoaches), the business of running stagecoaches or the act of journeying in them
- Staging (theatre), the process of selecting, designing, adapting to, or modifying the performance space for a play or film
- Cancer staging, a description (usually numbers I to V) of how much the cancer has spread
- Home staging, preparing a residence for sale in real estate
- Staging area, a location used to prepare items for use, such as for a military operation
- Staging, in bird migration, the practice of pausing at places along a migration route to rest and feed before proceeding
- Staging or scaffolding, in construction, a temporary work platform
- Staging, in drag racing, the process of aligning cars on the starting line drag racing
