= Attix5 Online Backup =

Attix5 in computing, is an online disk-to-disk backup solution. Attix5 is one of the oldest managed online backup companies, powering SMBs and enterprises.

On September 11, 2015, Attix5 was acquired by UK based cloud data management company Redstor. Redstor has since renamed the technology Redstor Pro.

== See also ==
- List of backup software
- Remote backup service
- Timeline of computing
