= IT disaster recovery =

Maintaining or reestablishing vital information technology infrastructure

IT disaster recovery (also, simply disaster recovery (DR)) is the process of maintaining or reestablishing vital infrastructure and systems following a natural or human-induced disaster, such as a storm or battle. DR employs policies, tools, and procedures with a focus on IT systems supporting critical business functions. This involves keeping all essential aspects of a business functioning despite significant disruptive events; it can therefore be considered a subset of business continuity (BC). DR assumes that the primary site is not immediately recoverable and restores data and services to a secondary site.

== IT service continuity ==
IT service continuity (ITSC) is a subset of BCP, which relies on the metrics (frequently used as key risk indicators) of recovery point/time objectives. It encompasses IT disaster recovery planning and the wider IT resilience planning. It also incorporates IT infrastructure and services related to communications, such as telephony and data communications.

=== Principles of backup sites ===
Planning includes arranging for backup sites, whether they are "hot" (operating prior to a disaster), "warm" (ready to begin operating), or "cold" (requires substantial work to begin operating), and standby sites with hardware as needed for continuity.

In 2008, the British Standards Institution launched a specific standard supporting Business Continuity Standard BS 25999, titled BS25777, specifically to align computer continuity with business continuity. This was withdrawn following the publication in March 2011 of ISO/IEC 27301, "Security techniques — Guidelines for information and communication technology readiness for business continuity."

ITIL has defined some of these terms.

=== Recovery Time Objective ===
The Recovery Time Objective (RTO) is the targeted duration of time and a service level within which a business process must be restored after a disruption in order to avoid a break in business continuity.

According to business continuity planning methodology, the RTO is established during the business impact analysis (BIA) by the owner(s) of the process, including identifying time frames for alternate or manual workarounds.

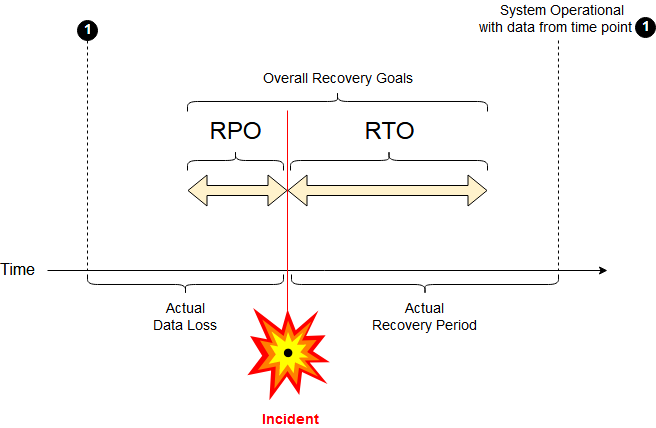
Example showing longer 'actual' times that do NOT meet either RPO or RTOs ('objectives'). Diagram provides schematic representation of the terms RPO and RTO.

RTO is a complement of RPO. The limits of acceptable or "tolerable" ITSC performance are measured by RTO and RPO in terms of time lost from normal business process functioning and data lost or not backed up during that period.

==== Recovery Time Actual ====
Recovery Time Actual (RTA) is the critical metric for business continuity and disaster recovery.

The business continuity group conducts timed rehearsals (or actuals), during which RTA gets determined and refined as needed.

=== Recovery Point Objective ===
A Recovery Point Objective (RPO) is the maximum acceptable interval during which transactional data is lost from an IT service.

For example, if RPO is measured in minutes, then in practice, off-site mirrored backups must be continuously maintained as a daily off-site backup will not suffice.

==== Relationship to RTO ====
A recovery that is not instantaneous restores transactional data over some interval without incurring significant risks or losses.

RPO measures the maximum time in which recent data might have been permanently lost and not a direct measure of loss quantity. For instance, if the BC plan is to restore up to the last available backup, then the RPO is the interval between such backups.

RPO is not determined by the existing backup regime. Instead BIA determines RPO for each service. When off-site data is required, the period during which data might be lost may start when backups are prepared, not when the backups are secured off-site.

=== Mean times ===
The recovery metrics can be converted to/used alongside failure metrics. Common measurements include mean time between failures (MTBF), mean time to first failure (MTFF), mean time to repair (MTTR), and mean down time (MDT).

=== Data synchronization points ===
A data synchronization point is the point at which a backup is completed. It halts update processing while a disk-to-disk copy is completed. The backup copy reflects the earlier version of the copy operation; not when the data is copied to tape or transmitted elsewhere.

=== System design ===
RTO and the RPO must be balanced, taking business risk into account, along with other system design criteria.

RPO is tied to the times backups are secured offsite. Sending synchronous copies to an offsite mirror allows for most unforeseen events. The use of physical transportation for tapes (or other transportable media) is common. Recovery can be activated at a predetermined site. Shared offsite space and hardware complete the package.

For high volumes of high-value transaction data, hardware can be split across multiple sites.

== History ==
Planning for disaster recovery and information technology (IT) developed in the mid to late 1970s as computer center managers began to recognize the dependence of their organizations on their computer systems.

At that time, most systems were batch-oriented mainframes. An offsite mainframe could be loaded from backup tapes pending recovery of the primary site; downtime was relatively less critical.

The disaster recovery industry developed to provide backup computer centers. Sungard Availability Services was one of the earliest such centers, located in Sri Lanka (1978).

During the 1980s and 90s, computing grew exponentially, including internal corporate timesharing, online data entry and real-time processing. Availability of IT systems became more important.

Regulatory agencies became involved; availability objectives of 2, 3, 4 or 5 nines (99.999%) were often mandated, and high-availability solutions for hot-site facilities were sought.

IT service continuity became essential as part of Business Continuity Management (BCM) and Information Security Management (ISM) as specified in ISO/IEC 27001 and ISO 22301 respectively.

The rise of cloud computing since 2010 created new opportunities for system resiliency. Service providers absorbed the responsibility for maintaining high service levels, including availability and reliability. They offered highly resilient network designs. Recovery as a Service (RaaS) is widely available and promoted by the Cloud Security Alliance.

== Classification ==
Disasters can be the result of three broad categories of threats and hazards.

- Natural hazards include acts of nature such as floods, hurricanes, tornadoes, earthquakes, and epidemics.
- Technological hazards include accidents or the failures of systems and structures such as pipeline explosions, transportation accidents, utility disruptions, dam failures, and accidental hazardous material releases.
- Human-caused threats that include intentional acts such as active assailant attacks, chemical or biological attacks, cyber attacks against data or infrastructure, sabotage, and war.

Preparedness measures for all categories and types of disasters fall into the five mission areas of prevention, protection, mitigation, response, and recovery.

== Planning ==
Research supports the idea that implementing a more holistic pre-disaster planning approach is more cost-effective. Every $1 spent on hazard mitigation (such as a disaster recovery plan) saves society $4 in response and recovery costs.

2015 disaster recovery statistics suggest that downtime lasting for one hour can cost

- small companies $8,000,
- mid-size organizations $74,000, and
- large enterprises $700,000 or more.

As IT systems have become increasingly critical to the smooth operation of a company, and arguably the economy as a whole, the importance of ensuring the continued operation of those systems, and their rapid recovery, has increased.

== Control measures ==
Control measures are steps or mechanisms that can reduce or eliminate threats. The choice of mechanisms is reflected in a disaster recovery plan (DRP).

Control measures can be classified as controls aimed at preventing an event from occurring, controls aimed at detecting or discovering unwanted events, and controls aimed at correcting or restoring the system after a disaster or an event.

These controls are documented and exercised regularly using so-called "DR tests".

== Strategies ==
The disaster recovery strategy derives from the business continuity plan. Metrics for business processes are then mapped to systems and infrastructure. A cost-benefit analysis highlights which disaster recovery measures are appropriate. Different strategies make sense based on the cost of downtime compared to the cost of implementing a particular strategy.

Common strategies include:

- backups to tape and sent off-site
- backups to disk on-site (copied to off-site disk) or off-site
- replication off-site, such that once the systems are restored or synchronized, possibly via storage area network technology
- private cloud solutions that replicate metadata (VMs, templates and disks) into the private cloud. Metadata are configured as an XML representation called Open Virtualization Format, and can be easily restored
- hybrid cloud solutions that replicate both on-site and to off-site data centers. This provides instant fail-over to on-site hardware or to cloud data centers.
- high availability systems which keep both the data and system replicated off-site, enabling continuous access to systems and data, even after a disaster (often associated with cloud storage).

Precautionary strategies may include:

- local mirrors of systems and/or data and use of disk protection technology such as RAID
- surge protectors — to minimize the effect of power surges on delicate electronic equipment
- use of an uninterruptible power supply (UPS) and/or backup generator to keep systems going in the event of a power failure
- fire prevention/mitigation systems such as alarms and fire extinguishers
- anti-virus software and other security measures.

== Disaster recovery as a service ==
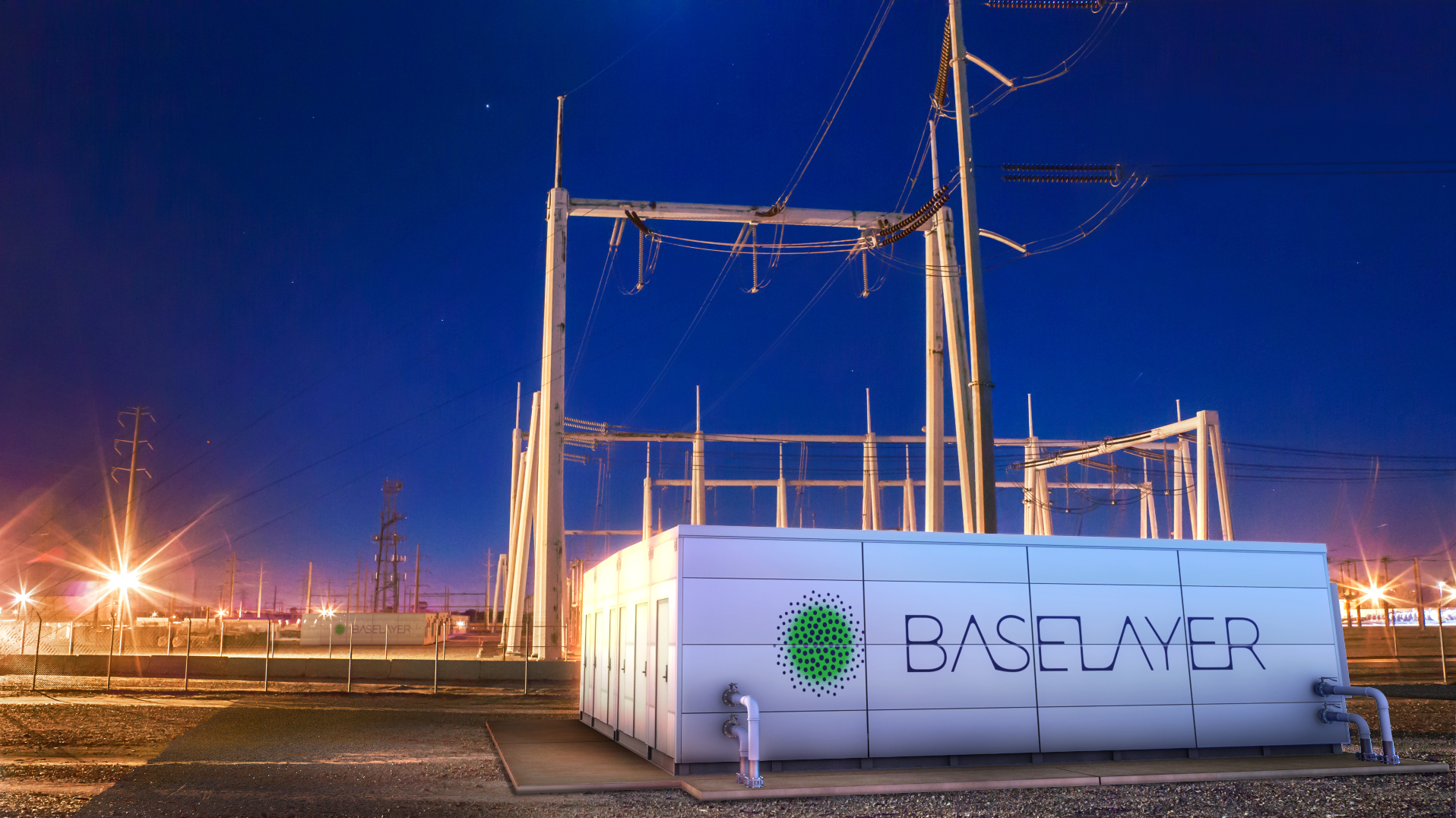
A modular data center connected to the power grid at a utility substation

Disaster recovery as a service (DRaaS) is an arrangement with a third party vendor to perform some or all DR functions for scenarios such as power outages, equipment failures, cyber attacks, and natural disasters.

== Disaster recovery for cloud systems ==
Following best practices can enhance disaster recovery strategy for cloud-hosted systems:

1. Flexibility: The disaster recovery strategy should be adaptable to support both partial failures (such as recovering specific files) and full environment failures.
2. Regular testing: Regular testing of the disaster recovery plan can verify its effectiveness and identify any weaknesses or gaps.
3. Clear roles and permissions: It should be clearly defined who is authorized to execute the disaster recovery plan, with separate access and permissions for these individuals. Implementing a clear separation of permissions between those who can execute the recovery and those who have access to backup data helps minimize the risk of unauthorized actions.
4. Documentation: The plan should be well-documented and easy-to-follow to ensure that operators can effectively follow it during stressful situations.

== Regulatory requirements ==
Several regulatory frameworks mandate disaster recovery capabilities for organizations handling sensitive data. In the healthcare sector, the Health Insurance Portability and Accountability Act (HIPAA) Security Rule requires covered entities and business associates to establish disaster recovery plans as part of the contingency planning standard (45 CFR 164.308(a)(7)). This includes procedures to restore any loss of data, alongside requirements for data backup plans, emergency mode operation plans, and periodic testing and revision of contingency procedures.

A December 2024 Notice of Proposed Rulemaking (NPRM) to update the HIPAA Security Rule proposes significantly expanded disaster recovery requirements, including a mandate to restore critical systems and data within 72 hours of an outage. The proposed rule also requires criticality analyses to prioritize system restoration order, regular testing of disaster recovery plans, and separate technical controls for backup and recovery systems. These requirements were influenced by large-scale incidents such as the 2024 Change Healthcare cyberattack, which disrupted claims processing and payment systems across the U.S. healthcare system for weeks.

In the financial sector, the Federal Financial Institutions Examination Council (FFIEC) requires financial institutions to maintain and test business continuity and disaster recovery plans, with specific expectations for recovery time objectives based on the criticality of business functions.

== See also ==
- Backup site
- BS 25999
- Business continuity planning
- Business continuity
- Continuous data protection
- Disaster recovery plan
- Disaster response
- Emergency management
- High availability
- Information System Contingency Plan
- Real-time recovery
- Recovery Consistency Objective
- Remote backup service
- Virtual tape library
