= Virtual tape library =

Data storage virtualization technology

A virtual tape library (VTL) is a data storage virtualization technology used typically for backup and recovery purposes. A VTL presents a storage component (usually hard disk storage) as tape libraries or tape drives for use with existing backup software.

Virtualizing the disk storage as tape allows integration of VTLs with existing backup software and existing backup and recovery processes and policies. The benefits of such virtualization include storage consolidation and faster data restore processes. For most mainframe data centers, the storage capacity varies, however protecting its business and mission critical data is always vital.

Most current VTL solutions use SAS or SATA disk arrays as the primary storage component due to their relatively low cost. The use of array enclosures increases the scalability of the solution by allowing the addition of more disk drives and enclosures to increase the storage capacity.

The shift to VTL also eliminates streaming problems that often impair efficiency in tape drives as disk technology does not rely on streaming and can write effectively regardless of data transfer speeds.

By backing up data to disks instead of tapes, VTL often increases performance of both backup and recovery operations. Restore processes are found to be faster than backup regardless of implementations. In some cases, the data stored on the VTL's disk array is exported to other media, such as physical tapes, for disaster recovery purposes (scheme called disk-to-disk-to-tape, or D2D2T).

Alternatively, most contemporary backup software products introduced also direct usage of the file system storage (especially network-attached storage, accessed through NFS and CIFS protocols over IP networks) not requiring a tape library emulation at all. They also often offer a disk staging feature: moving the data from disk to a physical tape for a long-term storage.

While a virtual tape library is very fast, the disk storage within is not designed to be removable, and does not usually involve physically removable external disk drives to be used for data archiving in place of tape. Since the disk storage is always connected to power and data sources and is never physically electrically isolated, it is vulnerable to potential damage and corruption due to nearby building or power grid lightning strikes.

== History ==
The first VTL solution was introduced by Cybernetics in 1992 under the name HSTC (high speed tape cache). Later, IBM released a Virtual Tape Server (VTS) introduced in 1997. It was targeted for a mainframe market, where many legacy applications tend to use a lot of very short tape volumes. It used the ESCON interface, and acted as a disk cache for the IBM 3494 tape library. A competitive offering from StorageTek (acquired in 2005 by Sun Microsystems, then subsequently by Oracle Corporation) was known as Virtual Storage Manager (VSM) which leveraged the market dominant STK Powderhorn library as a back store. Each product line has been enhanced to support larger disk buffer capacities, FICON, and more recently (c. 2010) "tapeless" disk-only environments.

Other offerings in the mainframe space are also "tapeless". DLm has been developed by EMC Corporation, while Luminex has gained popularity and wide acceptance by teaming with Data Domain to provide the benefits of data deduplication behind its Channel Gateway platform. With the consequent reduction in off-site replication bandwidth afforded by deduplication, it is possible and practical for this form of virtual tape to reduce recovery point objective time and recovery time objective to near zero (or instantaneous).

Outside of the mainframe environment, tape drives and libraries mostly featured SCSI. Likewise, VTLs were developed supporting popular SCSI transport protocols such as SPI (legacy systems), Fibre Channel, and iSCSI.

The FalconStor VTL is the foundation of nearly half of the products sold in the VTL market, according to an Enterprise Strategy Group analyst.

In mid-2010s VTLs got a rebirth thanks to hi-capacity "archive" drives from Seagate and HGST and more popular "tape in cloud" and Disk-to-Disk-to-Tape (often in cloud) scenarios.

Several companies offer gateway products that enable backup applications to store on-premises data as virtual tapes in cloud storage services, including Amazon Web Services (AWS), Microsoft Azure, Wasabi, and Backblaze. These products provide compatibility between backup applications and cloud object storage APIs. The supported storage services and archive tiers vary by product and may change over time.[1][2][3][4]

== See also ==
- Backup
- Tape library
- Tape Management System
- Disk staging for an alternative approach
- Emulation
- Storage virtualization
- Seven tiers of disaster recovery
