= MiMedia =

Online cloud backup company

- Developers: MiMedia, LLC.
- Type: Online backup service
- Website: www.mimedia.com www.ukclouddrive.net

MiMedia is a cloud-based online backup service company that has created the MiMedia Platform, a consumer cloud platform that enables all types of personal media (photos, videos, music, docs, contacts and SMS) to be secured in the cloud.

It was launched in 2010 by technology startup company MiMedia, LLC, based in Brooklyn, New York. Chris Giordano is its current CEO. As of 2012 MiMedia announced that users can receive 10GB of storage with their starter plan (free).

In May 2011, MiMedia unveiled a new pricing plan, by which users can get up to 7GB of storage space for free

In August 2015, Micromax Informatics invested in MiMedia.

In January 2016, MiMedia announced that it has raised a $15 million Series C round from a number of global family offices.

On March 22, 2022 MiMedia began trading on the Toronto Venture Exchange (TSXV) under the symbol: "MIM" via a reverse takeover transaction.

== Description of Business ==
MiMedia has built the MiMedia Platform, a next generation consumer cloud platform that enables consumers to access all their personal content (photos, videos, music, documents, SMS and contacts), on any device or operating system, whenever they want.

The MiMedia Platform enables consumers to access their content on any device by integrating seven apps into one platform – desktop apps for PC & Mac, smartphone apps for iOS & Android, tablet apps for iOS & Android and a web app that works on all browsers.

== Business Model ==
MiMedia operates a business model that is recurring, high-margin and diversified with multiple revenue streams:

1. Subscriptions / Freemium model: Free storage plan and multiple paid plans to upgrade for more storage.
2. Mobile Advertising: Non-intrusive advertisements within the smartphone gallery.
3. Value Added Services: Photo printing, premium photo editing and digital scanning, among others.

MiMedia may either share in the revenue generated with its partners or charge a license fee per user of its software. Branding in these deals is either "MiMedia" or ingredient, "powered-by MiMedia" branding. Selection and deployment of revenue streams will depend on target country dynamics. MiMedia's revenue streams are deployed and generating revenue today, with MiMedia's primary revenue engine of mobile advertisements showing strong and consistent metrics at scale that support the core model's go-forward assumptions.

MiMedia's partners assume the major cost components typical of MiMedia's business model, thus driving higher margins for MiMedia.
