= World Backup Day =

Celebration of backing up data

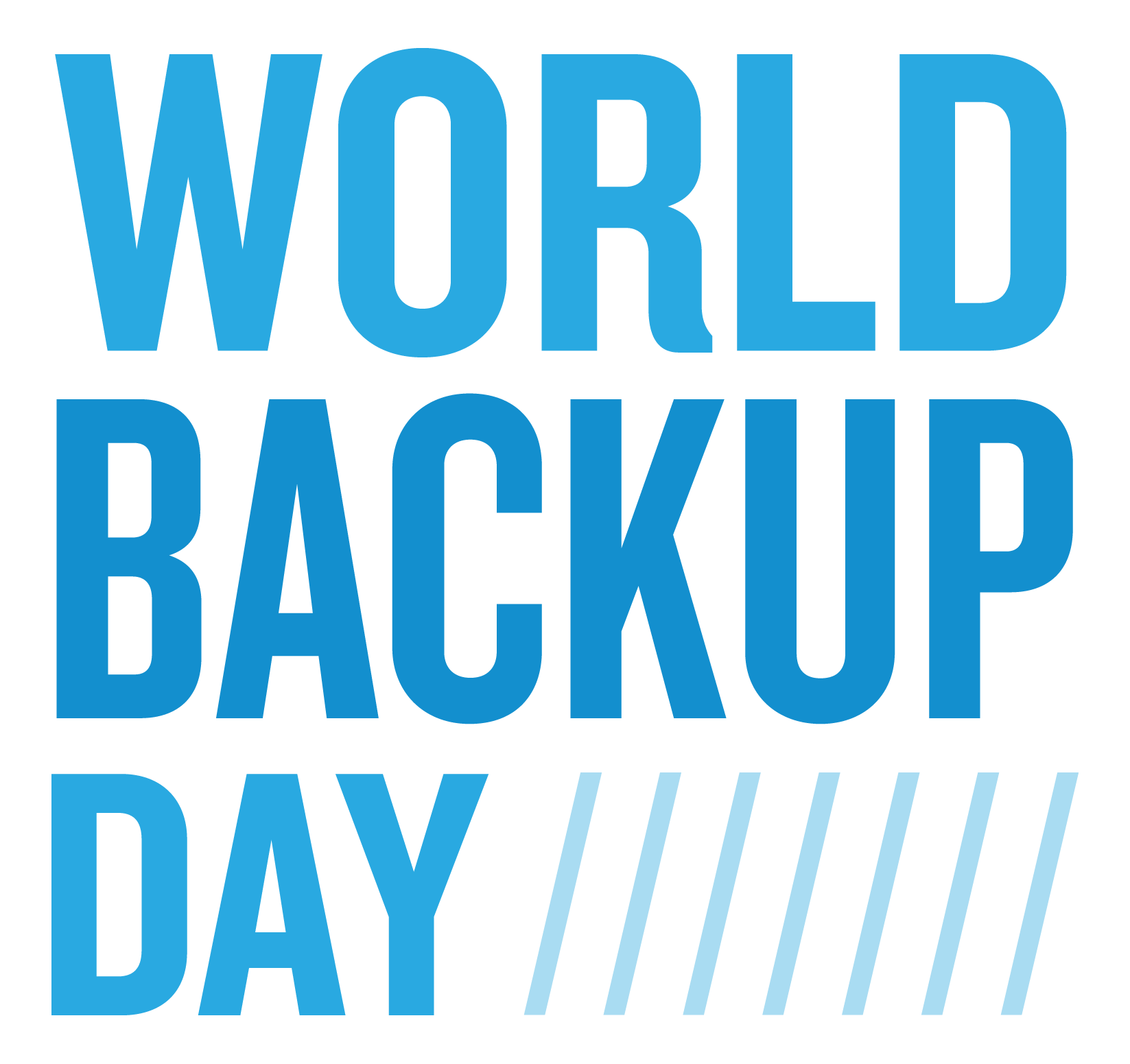
- Logo of the World Backup Day
- Official name: World Backup Day
- Date: 31 March
- Frequency: Annual
- First time: 2011
- Related to: Data Privacy Day

World Backup Day is a commemorative date celebrated annually by the backup industry and tech industry all over the world on March 31. It highlights the importance of protecting data and keeping systems and computers secure.

World Backup Day started with a post on Reddit where a user wrote about losing their hard drive and wishing someone had reminded them about how important it is to backup data. The campaign started by Ismail Jadun in 2011, and every year news outlets write articles about the importance of backing up data on World Backup Day.

== Observance ==
Every year on March 31, companies tweet and have podcasts about the importance of backing up data to prevent data loss. On the website WorldBackupDay.com people can make a pledge in ten languages on various social media channels about the importance of backing up their data. The World Backup Day is recognized as National Calendar Day on many national holiday websites.
