= Emulation =

Emulation may refer to:

- Emulation (computing), imitation of behavior of a computer or other electronic system with the help of another type of system

- Video game console emulator, software which emulates video game consoles

- Gaussian process emulator, a special case of the Gaussian process in statistics
- Surrogate model, a model which imitates or emulates a more complicated (usually in terms of computer simulation time) model.
- ASC Emulation, a football club in Martinique
- Emulation (observational learning), a theory of comparative psychology
- Emulation Lodge of Improvement, a masonic lodge whose aim is to preserve masonic ritual as closely as is possible to that which was formally accepted
- Socialist emulation, a form of competition that was practiced in the Soviet Union
- Whole brain emulation, aiming at mind uploading

== See also ==
- ST Emulous, a British tugboat
- Semulation, a mix of software simulation and hardware emulation of an electronic system
