= Disk staging =

Use of disks as an intermediate data backup

Disk staging is using disks as an additional, temporary stage of backup process before finally storing backup to tape. Backups stay on disk typically for a day or a week, before being copied to tape in a background process and deleted afterwards.

The process of disk staging is controlled by the same software that performs actual backups, which is different from virtual tape library where intermediate disk usage is hidden from main backup software. Both techniques are known as D2D2T (disk-to-disk-to-tape).

== Restoring data ==
Data is restored from disk if possible. But if the data exists only on tape it is restored directly (no backward-staging on restore).

== Reasons ==
Reasons behind using D2D2T:

- increase performance of small, random-access restores: disk has much faster random access than tape
- increase overall backup/restore performance: although disk and a tape have similar streaming throughput, you can easily scale disk throughput by the means of striping (and tape-striping is a much less established technique)
- increase utilization of tape drives: tape shoe-shining effect is eliminated when staging (note that it may still happen on tape restores)

== See also ==
- Backup
- Virtual tape library
