= Continuous data protection =

Continuous data protection (CDP), also called continuous backup or real-time backup, refers to backup of computer data by automatically saving a copy of every change made to that data, essentially capturing every version of the data that the user saves. In its true form it allows the user or administrator to restore data to any point in time. The technique was patented by British entrepreneur Pete Malcolm in 1989 as "a backup system in which a copy [editor's emphasis] of every change made to a storage medium is recorded as the change occurs [editor's emphasis]."

In an ideal case of continuous data protection, the recovery point objective—"the maximum targeted period in which data (transactions) might be lost from an IT service due to a major incident"—is zero, even though the recovery time objective—"the targeted duration of time and a service level within which a business process must be restored after a disaster (or disruption) in order to avoid unacceptable consequences associated with a break in business continuity"—is not zero. An example of a period in which data transactions might be lost is a major discount chain having card readers at its checkout counters shut down at multiple locations for close to two hours in the month of June 2019.

CDP runs as a service that captures changes to data to a separate storage location. There are multiple methods for capturing continuous live data changes involving different technologies that serve different needs. True CDP-based solutions can provide fine granularities of restorable objects ranging from crash-consistent images to logical objects such as files, mail boxes, messages, and database files and logs. This isn't necessarily true of near-CDP solutions.

== Differences from traditional backup ==
True continuous data protection is different from traditional backup in that it is not necessary to specify the point in time to recover from until ready to restore. Traditional backups only restore data from the time the backup was made. True continuous data protection, in contrast to "snapshots", has no backup schedules. When data is written to disk, it is also asynchronously written to a second location, either another computer over the network or an appliance. This introduces some overhead to disk-write operations but eliminates the need for scheduled backups.

Allowing restoring data to any point in time, "CDP is the gold standard—the most comprehensive and advanced data protection. But 'near CDP' technologies can deliver enough protection for many companies with less complexity and cost. For example, snapshots ["near-CDP" clarification in the section below] can provide a reasonable near-CDP-level of protection for file shares, letting users directly access data on the file share at regular intervals—say, every half hour or 15 minutes. That's certainly a higher level of protection than tape-based or disk-based nightly backups and may be all you need." Because "near-CDP does this [copying] at pre-set time intervals", it is essentially incremental backup initiated—separately for each source machine—by timer instead of script.

== Continuous vs near continuous ==
Since true CDP "backup write operations are executed at the level of the basic input/output system (BIOS) of the microcomputer in such a manner that normal use of the computer is unaffected", true CDP backup must in practice be run in conjunction with a virtual machine or equivalent—ruling it out for ordinary personal backup applications. It is therefore discussed in the "Enterprise client-server backup" article, rather than in the "Backup" article.

Some solutions marketed as continuous data protection may only allow restores at fixed intervals such as 15 minutes or one hour or 24 hours, because they automatically take incremental backups at those intervals. Such "near-CDP"—short for near-continuous data protection—schemes are not universally recognized as true continuous data protection, as they do not provide the ability to restore to any point in time. When the interval is shorter than one hour, "near-CDP" solutions—for example Arq Backup—are typically based on periodic "snapshots"; "to avoid downtime, high-availability systems may instead perform the backup on ... a read-only copy of the data set frozen at a point in time—and allow applications to continue writing to their data".

There is debate in the industry as to whether the granularity of backup must be "every write" to be CDP, or whether a "near-CDP" solution that captures the data every few minutes is good enough. The latter is sometimes called near continuous backup. The debate hinges on the use of the term continuous: whether only the backup process must be continuously automatically scheduled, which is often sufficient to achieve the benefits cited above, or whether the ability to restore from the backup also must be continuous. The Storage Networking Industry Association (SNIA) uses the "every write" definition.

There is a briefer sub-sub-section in the "Backup" article about this, now renamed to "Near-CDP" to avoid confusion.

== Differences from RAID, replication or mirroring ==
Continuous data protection differs from RAID, replication, or mirroring in that these technologies only protect one copy of the data (the most recent). If data becomes corrupted in a way that is not immediately detected, these technologies simply protect the corrupted data with no way to restore an uncorrupted version.

Continuous data protection protects against some effects of data corruption by allowing restoration of a previous, uncorrupted version of the data. Transactions that took place between the corrupting event and the restoration are lost, however. They could be recovered through other means, such as journaling.

== Backup disk size ==
In some situations, continuous data protection requires less space on backup media (usually disk) than traditional backup. Most continuous data protection solutions save byte or block-level differences rather than file-level differences. This means that if one byte of a 100 GB file is modified, only the changed byte or block is backed up. Traditional incremental and differential backups make copies of entire files; however starting around 2013 enterprise client-server backup applications have implemented a capability for block-level incremental backup, designed for large files such as databases.

== Risks and disadvantages ==
When real-time edits—especially in multimedia and CAD design environments—are backed up offsite over the upstream channel of the installation's broadband network, network bandwidth throttling may be needed to reduce the impact of true CDP. An alternative approach is to back up to a separate Fibre-Channel-connected SAN appliance.

== See also ==
- Quest AppAssure
- Cofio Software
- Disaster recovery
- EMC RecoverPoint
- FalconStor
- InMage DR-Scout
- List of backup software
- List of online backup services
- Single instance storage
- CloudEndure
- Write-ahead logging
