= Quiesce =

To pause or alter a device or application to achieve a consistent state

To quiesce is to pause or alter a device or application to achieve a consistent state, usually in preparation for a backup or other maintenance.

== Description ==
In software applications that modify information stored on disk, this generally involves flushing any outstanding writes; see buffering. With telecom applications, this generally involves allowing existing callers to finish their call but preventing new calls from initiating.

== Example ==
Perhaps the best known support for this was incorporated into Microsoft Shadow Copies which was introduced in Microsoft Windows Server 2003. For an application to be quiesced during the shadow copy process, it must register itself as a writer and it is responsible for putting itself into a quiescent mode upon notification.

== Vendor schemes ==
Various database and application vendors implement schemes to provide support for this feature including:

- Symantec's Livestate – now includes a quiesce process, as does VMware's VI3 snapshot and VCB features. Symantec supports Exchange and SQL.
- VMware support – IO system
- IBM DB2 LUW supports a Quiesce command that is used to indicate a state for which all users have been locked out of a database or an instance (of databases) so that administrative tasks can be performed.
- IBM DB2 for z/OS, OS/390 and IBM i Operating System has a utility command called QUIESCE, used in order to make it write all data belonging to a certain database (a logical entity in a DB2 subsystem) from the buffers, helping utility programs get DRAIN access on the datasets quickly.
- IBM DB2 for z/OS and OS/390 also supports a command SET LOG SUSPEND that technically speaking, stops it from writing to the log, in fact freezing any database activity (except for most queries). This mode is used sometimes for snapshot type backup schemes, thus only lasting for less than a second, ensuring backed up data is in a consistent state. This command is reversed with a SET LOG RESUME command.
- A graceful shutdown of WebSphere MQ is called quiescing.
- ORACLE also supports a Quiesce command since version 9i which allows existing users to continue to use resources but disallows new resources being made available.
- SYBASE ASE 12.0 and above support a QUIESCE DATABASE command that prevents any process from running commands that write to the transaction log. The primary purpose is to stop all update activity so the database files can be copied or backed up using OS level utilities. While the database is quiesced, it is still available to users for read-only queries.
- Microsoft Windows SharePoint Services 3.0 and Microsoft Office SharePoint Server 2007/2010 support a QUIESCE or QUIESCE FROM TEMPLATE (2010) option within the Central Administration operations window. This allows an administrator to stop the server farm from accepting new user connections and gradually brings any long-running applications offline without causing data loss.
- JADE Object Oriented Database system can perform a quiesced backup with the parameter 'quiesced=true'. The database is placed in a quiescent state by allowing current active transactions to complete and then flushing modified buffers from cache to the stable database. During a quiesced backup, updating transactions are not permitted and attempts to execute database transactions raise a database exception.
- Microsoft Visual Studio Team Foundation Server supports quiesce functionality by using the TFS Service Control command-line utility. More information exists about this command-line utility in the MSDN Library. A Microsoft Knowledge Base article describes it by indicating that it disables access to Team Foundation Server services for the duration of servicing operations.

== See also ==
The dictionary definition of quiesce at Wiktionary
