= Seed loading =

Seed loading is a technology used primarily in remote data backup solutions. It prevents large amounts of backup data being sent over the Internet. Instead, the backup is performed locally on a storage medium (e.g. an external hard disk) which is then shipped to the external storage location, where it is stored in the appropriate account. This method saves the user much time and bandwidth.

In general, this method of external backup is highly effective when the backup solution supports incremental or differential backups. The first backup is then performed using seed load technology; afterwards only new and changed data has to be backed up over the Internet.
