= Information System Contingency Plan =

An Information System Contingency Plan (ISCP) is a pre-established plan for restoration of the services of a given information system after a disruption.

The US National Institute of Standards and Technology Computer Security Resource Center (CSRC) has published a Special Publication (SP) named SP 800-34 guiding organizations as to how an ISCP should be developed.
