= Backup =

Stored data in computer systems

In information technology, a backup, or data backup is a copy of computer data taken and stored elsewhere so that it may be used to restore the original after a data loss event. The verb form, referring to the process of doing so, is "back up", whereas the noun and adjective form is "backup". Backups can be used to recover data after its loss from data deletion or corruption, or to recover data from an earlier time. Backups provide a simple form of IT disaster recovery; however not all backup systems are able to reconstitute a computer system or other complex configuration such as a computer cluster, active directory server, or database server.

A backup system contains at least one copy of all data considered worth saving. The data storage requirements can be large. An information repository model may be used to provide structure to this storage. There are different types of data storage devices used for copying backups of data that is already in secondary storage onto archive files. (Note: In contrast to everyday use of the term "archive", the data stored in an "archive file" is not necessarily old or of historical interest.) There are also different ways these devices can be arranged to provide geographic dispersion, data security, and portability.

Data is selected, extracted, and manipulated for storage. The process can include methods for dealing with live data, including open files, as well as compression, encryption, and de-duplication. Additional techniques apply to enterprise client-server backup. Backup schemes may include dry runs that validate the reliability of the data being backed up. There are limitations and human factors involved in any backup scheme.

== Storage ==
A backup strategy requires an information repository, "a secondary storage space for data" that aggregates backups of data "sources". The repository could be as simple as a list of all backup media (DVDs, etc.) and the dates produced, or could include a computerized index, catalog, or relational database.

=== 3-2-1 backup rule ===
The backup data needs to be stored, requiring a backup rotation scheme, which is a system of backing up data to computer media that limits the number of backups of different dates retained separately, by appropriate re-use of the data storage media by overwriting of backups no longer needed. The scheme determines how and when each piece of removable storage is used for a backup operation and how long it is retained once it has backup data stored on it. The 3-2-1 rule can aid in the backup process. It states that there should be at least 3 copies of the data, stored on 2 different types of storage media, and one copy should be kept offsite, in a remote location (this can include cloud storage). 2 or more different media should be used to eliminate data loss due to similar reasons (for example, optical discs may tolerate being underwater while LTO tapes may not, and SSDs cannot fail due to head crashes or damaged spindle motors since they do not have any moving parts, unlike hard drives). An offsite copy protects against fire, theft of physical media (such as tapes or discs) and natural disasters like floods and earthquakes. Physically protected hard drives are an alternative to an offsite copy, but they have limitations like only being able to resist fire for a limited period of time, so an offsite copy still remains as the ideal choice.

Because there is no perfect storage, many backup experts recommend maintaining a second copy on a local physical device, even if the data is also backed up offsite. Ransomware can still overwrite data on a backup drive if it is plugged and accessible to a computer. Because of this, it is recommended to disconnect at least one of the backup media if not in use.

=== Backup methods ===
==== Unstructured ====
An unstructured repository may simply be a stack of tapes, DVD-Rs or external HDDs with minimal information about what was backed up and when. This method is the easiest to implement, but unlikely to achieve a high level of recoverability as it lacks automation.

==== Full only/System imaging ====
A repository using this backup method contains complete source data copies taken at one or more specific points in time. Copying system images, this method is frequently used by computer technicians to record known good configurations. However, imaging is generally more useful as a way of deploying a standard configuration to many systems rather than as a tool for making ongoing backups of diverse systems.

==== Incremental ====
An incremental backup stores data changed since a reference point in time. Duplicate copies of unchanged data are not copied. Typically a full backup of all files is made once or at infrequent intervals, serving as the reference point for an incremental repository. Subsequently, a number of incremental backups are made after successive time periods. Restores begin with the last full backup and then apply the incrementals. Some backup systems can create a synthetic full backup from a series of incrementals, thus providing the equivalent of frequently doing a full backup. When done to modify a single archive file, this speeds restores of recent versions of files.

==== Near-CDP ====
Continuous Data Protection (CDP) refers to a backup that instantly saves a copy of every change made to the data. This allows restoration of data to any point in time and is the most comprehensive and advanced data protection. Near-CDP backup applications—often marketed as "CDP"—automatically take incremental backups at a specific interval, for example every 15 minutes, one hour, or 24 hours. They can therefore only allow restores to an interval boundary. Near-CDP backup applications use journaling and are typically based on periodic "snapshots", read-only copies of the data frozen at a particular point in time.

Near-CDP (except for Apple Time Machine) intent-logs every change on the host system, often by saving byte or block-level differences rather than file-level differences. This backup method differs from simple disk mirroring in that it enables a roll-back of the log and thus a restoration of old images of data. Intent-logging allows precautions for the consistency of live data, protecting self-consistent files but requiring applications "be quiesced and made ready for backup."

Near-CDP is more practicable for ordinary personal backup applications, as opposed to true CDP, which must be run in conjunction with a virtual machine or equivalent and is therefore generally used in enterprise client-server backups.

Software may create copies of individual files such as written documents, multimedia projects, or user preferences, to prevent failed write events caused by power outages, operating system crashes, or exhausted disk space, from causing data loss. A common implementation is an appended ".bak" extension to the file name.

==== Reverse incremental ====
A Reverse incremental backup method stores a recent archive file "mirror" of the source data and a series of differences between the "mirror" in its current state and its previous states. A reverse incremental backup method starts with a non-image full backup. After the full backup is performed, the system periodically synchronizes the full backup with the live copy, while storing the data necessary to reconstruct older versions. This can either be done using hard links—as Apple Time Machine does, or using binary diffs.

==== Differential ====
A differential backup saves only the data that has changed since the last full backup. This means a maximum of two backups from the repository are used to restore the data. However, as time from the last full backup (and thus the accumulated changes in data) increases, so does the time to perform the differential backup. Restoring an entire system requires starting from the most recent full backup and then applying just the last differential backup.

A differential backup copies files that have been created or changed since the last full backup, regardless of whether any other differential backups have been made since, whereas an incremental backup copies files that have been created or changed since the most recent backup of any type (full or incremental). Changes in files may be detected through a more recent date/time of last modification file attribute, and/or changes in file size. Other variations of incremental backup include multi-level incrementals and block-level incrementals that compare parts of files instead of just entire files.

=== Storage media ===
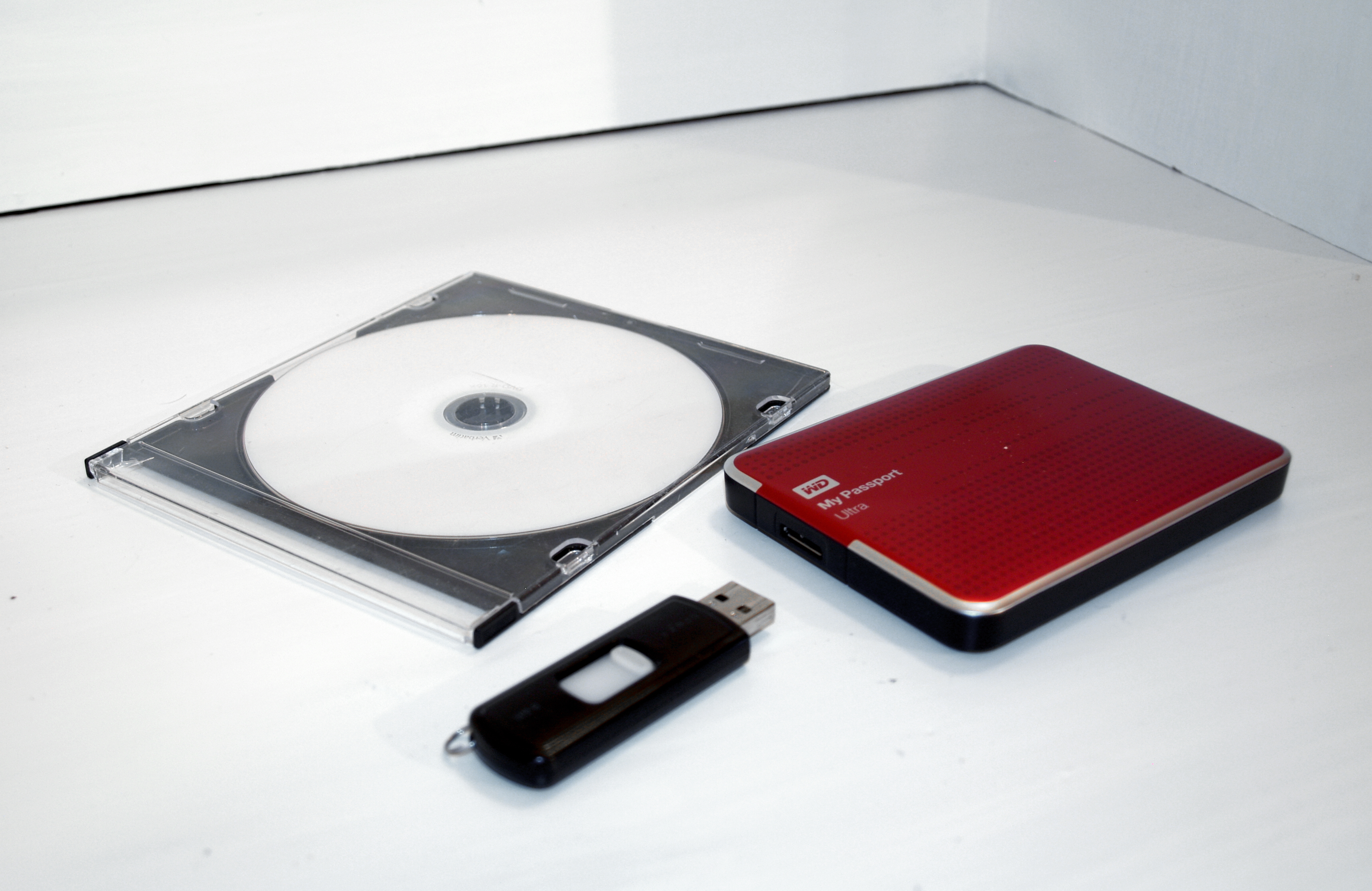
From left to right, a DVD disc in plastic cover, a USB flash drive and an external hard drive

Regardless of the repository model that is used, the data has to be copied onto an archive file data storage medium. The medium used is also referred to as the type of backup destination.

==== Magnetic tape ====
Magnetic tape was for a long time the most commonly used medium for bulk data storage, backup, archiving, and interchange. It was previously a less expensive option, but this is no longer the case for smaller amounts of data. Tape is a sequential access medium, so the rate of continuously writing or reading data can be very fast. While tape media itself has a low cost per space, tape drives are typically dozens of times as expensive as hard disk drives and optical drives. Tape media are generally rotated on a schedule so at least one set is off-site in case something should happen to the building where the primary copy of the data lives.

Many tape formats have been proprietary or specific to certain markets like mainframes or a particular brand of personal computer. By 2014 LTO had become the primary tape technology. The other remaining viable "super" format is the IBM 3592 (also referred to as the TS11xx series). The Oracle StorageTek T10000 was discontinued in 2016.

==== Hard disk ====
The use of hard disk storage has increased over time as it has become progressively cheaper. Hard disks are usually easy to use, widely available, and can be accessed quickly. However, hard disk backups are close-tolerance mechanical devices and may be more easily damaged than tapes, especially while being transported. In the mid-2000s, several drive manufacturers began to produce portable drives employing ramp loading and accelerometer technology (sometimes termed a "shock sensor"), and by 2010 the industry average in drop tests for drives with that technology showed drives remaining intact and working after a 36-inch non-operating drop onto industrial carpeting. Some manufacturers also offer 'ruggedized' portable hard drives, which include a shock-absorbing case around the hard disk, and claim a range of higher drop specifications. Over a period of years the stability of hard disk backups is shorter than that of tape backups.

External hard disks can be connected via local interfaces like SCSI, USB, FireWire, or eSATA, or via longer-distance technologies like Ethernet, iSCSI, or Fibre Channel. Some disk-based backup systems, via Virtual Tape Libraries or otherwise, support data deduplication, which can reduce the amount of disk storage capacity consumed by daily and weekly backup data.

==== Optical storage ====
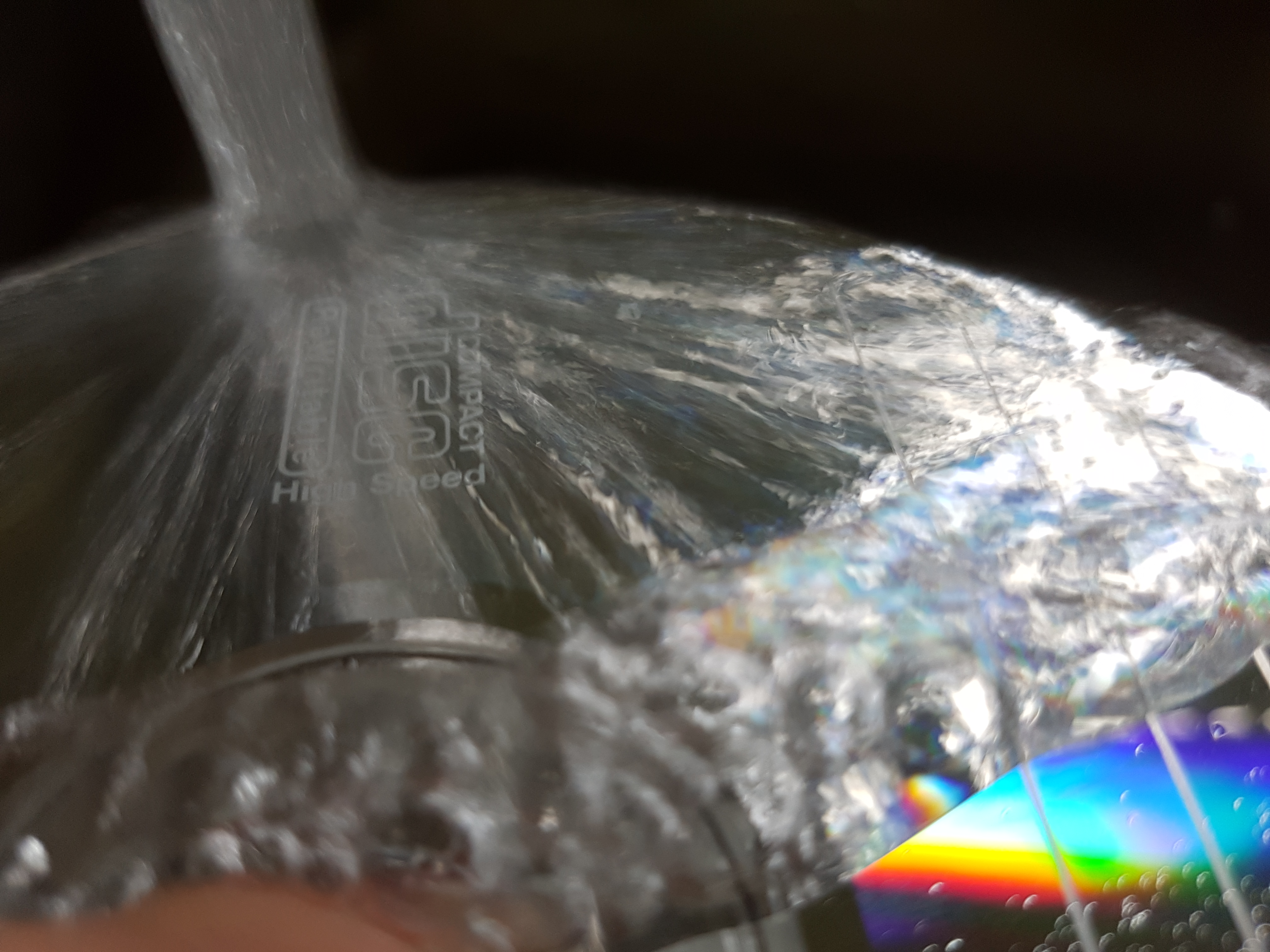
Optical discs are not vulnerable to water, making them likely to survive a flood disaster.

Optical storage uses lasers to store and retrieve data. Recordable CDs, DVDs, and Blu-ray Discs are commonly used with personal computers and are generally cheap. The capacities and speeds of these discs have typically been lower than hard disks or tapes. Advances in optical media may shrink that gap in the future.

Potential future data losses caused by gradual media degradation can be predicted by measuring the rate of correctable minor data errors, of which consecutively too many increase the risk of uncorrectable sectors. Support for error scanning varies among optical drive vendors.

Many optical disc formats are WORM type, which makes them useful for archival purposes since the data cannot be changed in any way, including by user error and by malware such as ransomware. Moreover, optical discs are not vulnerable to head crashes, magnetism, imminent water ingress or power surges; and, a fault of the drive typically just halts the spinning.

Optical media is modular; the storage controller is not tied to media itself like with hard drives or flash storage (→flash memory controller), allowing it to be removed and accessed through a different drive. However, recordable media may degrade earlier under long-term exposure to light.

Some optical storage systems allow for cataloged data backups without human contact with the discs, allowing for longer data integrity. A French study in 2008 indicated that the lifespan of typically-sold CD-Rs was 2–10 years, but one manufacturer later estimated the longevity of its CD-Rs with a gold-sputtered layer to be as high as 100 years. Sony's proprietary Optical Disc Archive can in 2016 reach a read rate of 250 MB/s.

==== Solid-state drive ====
Solid-state drives (SSDs) use integrated circuit assemblies to store data. Flash memory, thumb drives, USB flash drives, CompactFlash, SmartMedia, Memory Sticks, and Secure Digital card devices are relatively expensive for their low capacity, but convenient for backing up relatively low data volumes. A solid-state drive does not contain any movable parts, making it less susceptible to physical damage, and can have huge throughput of around 500 Mbit/s up to 6 Gbit/s. Available SSDs have become more capacious and cheaper. Flash memory backups are stable for fewer years than hard disk backups.

==== Remote backup service ====
Remote backup services or cloud backups involve service providers storing data offsite. This has been used to protect against events such as fires, floods, or earthquakes which could destroy locally stored backups. Cloud-based backup (through services like or similar to Google Drive, and Microsoft OneDrive) provides a layer of data protection. However, the users must trust the provider to maintain the privacy and integrity of their data, with confidentiality enhanced by the use of encryption. Because speed and availability are limited by a user's online connection, users with large amounts of data may need to use seed loading and bulk restore.

=== Management ===
Various methods can be used to manage backup media, striking a balance between accessibility, security and cost. These media management methods are not mutually exclusive and are frequently combined to meet the user's needs. Using on-line disks for staging data before it is sent to a near-line tape library is a common example.

==== Online ====
Online backup storage is typically the most accessible type of data storage, and can begin a restore in milliseconds. An internal hard disk or a disk array (maybe connected to SAN) is an example of an online backup. This type of storage is convenient and speedy, but is vulnerable to being deleted or overwritten, either by accident, by malevolent action, or in the wake of a data-deleting virus payload.

==== Near-line ====
Nearline storage is typically less accessible and less expensive than online storage, but still useful for backup data storage. A mechanical device is usually used to move media units from storage into a drive where the data can be read or written. Generally it has safety properties similar to on-line storage. An example is a tape library with restore times ranging from seconds to a few minutes.

==== Off-line ====
Off-line storage requires some direct action to provide access to the storage media: for example, inserting a tape into a tape drive or plugging in a cable. Because the data is not accessible via any computer except during limited periods in which they are written or read back, they are largely immune to on-line backup failure modes. Access time varies depending on whether the media are on-site or off-site.

==== Off-site data protection ====
Backup media may be sent to an off-site vault to protect against a disaster or other site-specific problem. The vault can be as simple as a system administrator's home office or as sophisticated as a disaster-hardened, temperature-controlled, high-security bunker with facilities for backup media storage. A data replica can be off-site but also on-line (e.g., an off-site RAID mirror).

==== Backup site ====
A backup site or disaster recovery center is used to store data that can enable computer systems and networks to be restored and properly configured in the event of a disaster. Some organisations have their own data recovery centres, while others contract this out to a third-party. Due to high costs, backing up is rarely considered the preferred method of moving data to a DR site. A more typical way would be remote disk mirroring, which keeps the DR data as up to date as possible.

== Selection and extraction of data ==
A backup operation starts with selecting and extracting coherent units of data. Most data on modern computer systems is stored in discrete units, known as files. These files are organized into filesystems. Deciding what to back up at any given time involves tradeoffs. By backing up too much redundant data, the information repository will fill up too quickly. Backing up an insufficient amount of data can eventually lead to the loss of critical information.

=== Files ===
- Copying files: Making copies of files is the simplest and most common way to perform a backup. A means to perform this basic function is included in all backup software and all operating systems.
- Partial file copying: A backup may include only the blocks or bytes within a file that have changed in a given period of time. This can substantially reduce needed storage space, but requires higher sophistication to reconstruct files in a restore situation. Some implementations require integration with the source file system.
- Deleted files: To prevent the unintentional restoration of files that have been intentionally deleted, a record of the deletion must be kept.
- Versioning of files: Most backup applications, other than those that do only full only/System imaging, also back up files that have been modified since the last backup. "That way, you can retrieve many different versions of a given file, and if you delete it on your hard disk, you can still find it in your [information repository] archive."

=== Filesystems ===
- Filesystem dump: A copy of the whole filesystem in block-level can be made. This is also known as a "raw partition backup" and is related to disk imaging. The process usually involves unmounting the filesystem and running a program like dd (Unix). Because the disk is read sequentially and with large buffers, this type of backup can be faster than reading every file normally, especially when the filesystem contains many small files, is highly fragmented, or is nearly full. But because this method also reads the free disk blocks that contain no useful data, this method can also be slower than conventional reading, especially when the filesystem is nearly empty. Some filesystems, such as XFS, provide a "dump" utility that reads the disk sequentially for high performance while skipping unused sections. The corresponding restore utility can selectively restore individual files or the entire volume at the operator's choice.
- Identification of changes: Some filesystems have an archive bit for each file that says it was recently changed. Some backup software looks at the date of the file and compares it with the last backup to determine whether the file was changed.
- Versioning file system: A versioning filesystem tracks all changes to a file. The NILFS versioning filesystem for Linux is an example.

=== Live data ===
Files that are actively being updated present a challenge to back up. One way to back up live data is to temporarily quiesce them (e.g., close all files), take a "snapshot", and then resume live operations. At this point the snapshot can be backed up through normal methods. A snapshot is an instantaneous function of some filesystems that presents a copy of the filesystem as if it were frozen at a specific point in time, often by a copy-on-write mechanism. Snapshotting a file while it is being changed results in a corrupted file that is unusable. This is also the case across interrelated files, as may be found in a conventional database or in applications such as Microsoft Exchange Server. The term fuzzy backup can be used to describe a backup of live data that looks like it ran correctly, but does not represent the state of the data at a single point in time.

Backup options for data files that cannot be or are not quiesced include:

- Open file backup: Many backup software applications undertake to back up open files in an internally consistent state. Some applications simply check whether open files are in use and try again later. Other applications exclude open files that are updated very frequently. Some low-availability interactive applications can be backed up via natural/induced pausing.
- Interrelated database files backup: Some interrelated database file systems offer a means to generate a "hot backup" of the database while it is online and usable. This may include a snapshot of the data files plus a snapshotted log of changes made while the backup is running. Upon a restore, the changes in the log files are applied to bring the copy of the database up to the point in time at which the initial backup ended. Other low-availability interactive applications can be backed up via coordinated snapshots. However, genuinely-high-availability interactive applications can be only be backed up via Continuous Data Protection.

=== Metadata ===
Not all information stored on the computer is stored in files. Accurately recovering a complete system from scratch requires keeping track of this non-file data too.

- System description: System specifications are needed to procure an exact replacement after a disaster.
- Boot sector: The boot sector can sometimes be recreated more easily than saving it. It usually is not a normal file and the system will not boot without it.
- Partition layout: The layout of the original disk, as well as partition tables and filesystem settings, is needed to properly recreate the original system.
- File metadata: Each file's permissions, owner, group, ACLs, and any other metadata need to be backed up for a restore to properly recreate the original environment.
- System metadata: Different operating systems have different ways of storing configuration information. Microsoft Windows keeps a registry of system information that is more difficult to restore than a typical file.

== Manipulation of data and dataset optimization ==
It is frequently useful or required to manipulate the data being backed up to optimize the backup process. These manipulations can improve backup speed, restore speed, data security, media usage and/or reduced bandwidth requirements.

=== Automated data grooming ===
Out-of-date data can be automatically deleted, but for personal backup applications—as opposed to enterprise client-server backup applications where automated data "grooming" can be customized—the deletion (Note: Some backup applications—notably rsync and CrashPlan—term removing backup data "pruning" instead of "grooming".) can at most be globally delayed or be disabled.

=== Compression ===
Various schemes can be employed to shrink the size of the source data to be stored so that it uses less storage space. Compression is frequently a built-in feature of tape drive hardware.

=== Deduplication ===
Redundancy due to backing up similarly configured workstations can be reduced, thus storing just one copy. This technique can be applied at the file or raw block level. This potentially large reduction is called deduplication. It can occur on a server before any data moves to backup media, sometimes referred to as source/client side deduplication. This approach also reduces bandwidth required to send backup data to its target media. The process can also occur at the target storage device, sometimes referred to as inline or back-end deduplication.

=== Duplication ===
Sometimes backups are duplicated to a second set of storage media. This can be done to rearrange the archive files to optimize restore speed, or to have a second copy at a different location or on a different storage medium—as in the disk-to-disk-to-tape capability of Enterprise client-server backup.

=== Encryption ===
High-capacity removable storage media such as backup tapes present a data security risk if they are lost or stolen. Encrypting the data on these media can mitigate this problem, however encryption is a CPU intensive process that can slow down backup speeds, and the security of the encrypted backups is only as effective as the security of the key management policy.

=== Multiplexing ===
When there are many more computers to be backed up than there are destination storage devices, the ability to use a single storage device with several simultaneous backups can be useful. However cramming the scheduled backup window via "multiplexed backup" is only used for tape destinations.

=== Refactoring ===
The process of rearranging the sets of backups in an archive file is known as refactoring. For example, if a backup system uses a single tape each day to store the incremental backups for all the protected computers, restoring one of the computers could require many tapes. Refactoring could be used to consolidate all the backups for a single computer onto a single tape, creating a "synthetic full backup". This is especially useful for backup systems that do incrementals forever style backups.

=== Staging ===
Sometimes backups are copied to a staging disk before being copied to tape. This process is sometimes referred to as D2D2T, an acronym for Disk-to-disk-to-tape. It can be useful if there is a problem matching the speed of the final destination device with the source device, as is frequently faced in network-based backup systems. It can also serve as a centralized location for applying other data manipulation techniques.

=== Objectives ===
- Recovery point objective (RPO): The point in time that the restarted infrastructure will reflect, expressed as "the maximum targeted period in which data (transactions) might be lost from an IT service due to a major incident". Essentially, this is the roll-back that will be experienced as a result of the recovery. The most desirable RPO would be the point just prior to the data loss event. Making a more recent recovery point achievable requires increasing the frequency of synchronization between the source data and the backup repository.
- Recovery time objective (RTO): The amount of time elapsed between disaster and restoration of business functions.
- Data security: In addition to preserving access to data for its owners, data must be restricted from unauthorized access. Backups must be performed in a manner that does not compromise the original owner's undertaking. This can be achieved with data encryption and proper media handling policies.
- Data retention period: Regulations and policy can lead to situations where backups are expected to be retained for a particular period, but not any further. Retaining backups after this period can lead to unwanted liability and sub-optimal use of storage media.
- Checksum or hash function validation: Applications that back up to tape archive files need this option to verify that the data was accurately copied.
- Backup process monitoring: Enterprise client-server backup applications need a user interface that allows administrators to monitor the backup process, and proves compliance to regulatory bodies outside the organization; for example, an insurance company in the USA might be required under HIPAA to demonstrate that its client data meet records retention requirements.
- User-initiated backups and restores: To avoid or recover from minor disasters, such as inadvertently deleting or overwriting the "good" versions of one or more files, the computer user—rather than an administrator—may initiate backups and restores (from not necessarily the most-recent backup) of files or folders.

== See also ==
About backup

- Backup software and services
  - List of backup software
  - Comparison of online backup services
  - Comparison of backup software
- Glossary of backup terms
- Virtual backup appliance

Related topics

- Data consistency
- Data degradation
- Data portability
- Data proliferation
- Database dump
- Digital preservation
- Disaster recovery and business continuity auditing
- World Backup Day
