= Backup site =

Alternative location where an organization can relocate after a disaster

A backup site, also called a recovery site or alternate site, is a location where an organization can continue its essential operations after a disaster or a serious disruption at its main site. Disasters may include fires, floods, cyberattacks, power failures, pandemics, or other events that make the primary workplace or data center unusable. Backup sites are a central part of disaster recovery planning and business continuity management because they help organizations keep working, protect data, and reduce downtime.

== Purpose ==
The purpose of a backup site is to provide a safe place where people, technology, and critical processes can be restored quickly after an incident. Without such a site, a serious outage at the main location can stop operations entirely, which may lead to lost revenue, damaged reputation, and even legal or regulatory problems. In many industries, such as banking, health care, and government, rules and standards require organizations to have clear business continuity and disaster recovery capabilities, including alternate sites.

A backup site is planned as part of a wider business continuity plan (BCP) and disaster recovery plan (DRP). The BCP focuses on keeping key services available, while the DRP focuses on restoring IT systems and data after a disruption. Backup sites connect to both because they host the people, equipment, and network services needed to restart or continue these functions.

== Types of backup sites ==
Backup sites are grouped into three main types: cold sites, warm sites, and hot sites. These categories describe how ready the site is and how quickly it can take over operations after a disaster.

=== Cold site ===
A cold site is the simplest and usually the least expensive form of backup site. It is mainly an empty or lightly equipped facility that has basic infrastructure such as space, power supply, network cabling, air conditioning, and sometimes raised floors for server rooms. However, it normally does not include active computer systems, installed applications, or up‑to‑date copies of data.

When a disaster happens, the organization must move in equipment, install systems, and restore data backups before work can resume. This means that recovery at a cold site can be slow, often taking days or even weeks, depending on the complexity of the systems and the availability of hardware. Because the ongoing costs are low, cold sites are often used by smaller organizations or those that can tolerate longer downtime.

=== Warm site ===
A warm site represents a compromise between a cold site and a hot site. These facilities usually have some hardware, software, and connectivity already in place. The systems may not be running in real time, but the basic setup exists. Data backups may be stored on-site or remotely, although they might be several days old.

In the event of a disaster, more recent backup data is delivered or restored over the network, so the organization can start operations faster than at a cold site. Recovery time at a warm site is often measured in hours or a day, which can be acceptable for many businesses or services that do not require instant failover. Costs are higher than a cold site because some systems are maintained in advance, but they are lower than a hot site.

=== Hot site ===
A hot site is the most advanced and expensive type of backup site. It is a near duplicate of the original site of the organization, including full computer systems as well as complete backups of user data. Real-time synchronization between the two sites may be used to completely mirror the data environment of the original site using wide-area network links and specialized software. Following a disruption to the original site, the hot site exists so that the organization can relocate, with minimal losses to normal operations in the shortest recovery time. Ideally, a hot site will be up and running within a matter of hours. Personnel may need to be moved to the hot site, but it is possible that the hot site may be operational from a data-processing perspective before staff has relocated. The capacity of the hot site may or may not match the capacity of the original site depending on the organization's requirements. This type of backup site is the most expensive to operate. Hot sites are popular with organizations that operate real-time processes such as financial institutions, government agencies, and eCommerce providers.

The most important feature offered from a hot site is that the production environment(s) is running concurrently with the main datacenter. This synchronizing allows for minimal impact and downtime to business operations. In the event of a significant outage, the hot site can take the place of the affected site immediately. However, this level of redundancy comes with a high cost, and businesses will need to weigh the cost-benefit-analysis (CBA) of hot site utilization. Maintaining duplicate hardware, software, and continuous synchronization requires investment and ongoing maintenance.

These days, if the backup site is down and misses the "proactive" approach, it may not be considered a hot site depending on the level of maturity of the organization regarding the ISO 22301 approach (international standard for Business Continuity Management). As a result, hot sites are typically reserved for critical systems where downtime cannot be tolerated.

== Alternate sites ==
An alternate site is any location where people and essential equipment can be moved to continue operations until the primary environment is restored or replaced. Some organizations own and operate their own secondary sites, especially if they already have multiple offices or data centers in different regions. Others use commercial disaster recovery providers that specialize in offering shared facilities and infrastructure for backup use.

Organizations may sign reciprocal agreements, where two companies agree to host each other’s staff and systems if a disaster affects one of them. These arrangements can reduce cost, but they also require careful planning to make sure that, during a real event, both sides have enough capacity and that a wide‑area disaster does not impact them simultaneously. Some commercial providers also offer priority services, where customers pay higher fees to receive guaranteed access to the site during large scale incidents when multiple clients might request the same facility.

== Choosing ==
Choosing the type of backup site to be used is decided by an organization based on a cost vs. benefit analysis. Hot sites are traditionally more expensive than cold sites, since much of the equipment the company needs must be purchased and thus people are needed to maintain it, making the operational costs higher. However, if the same organization loses a substantial amount of revenue for each day they are inactive, then it may be worth the cost. Another advantage of a hot site is that it can be used for operations prior to a disaster happening. This load balanced production processing method can be cost effective, and will provide the users with the security of minimal downtime during an event that affects one of the data centers.

The advantages of a cold site are simple — cost. It requires fewer resources to operate a cold site because no equipment has been brought prior to the disaster. Some organizations may store older versions of the hardware in the center. This may be appropriate in a server farm environment, where old hardware could be used in many cases. The downside with a cold site is the potential cost that must be incurred in order to make the cold site effective. The costs of purchasing equipment on very short notice may be higher and the disaster may make the equipment difficult to obtain.

== Commercial sites ==
When contracting services from a commercial provider of backup site capability, organizations should review the contract and paying attention to the contractual usage provision and invocation procedures, active support, and service-level agreements (SLAs). Providers may sign up more than one organization for a given site or facility, often depending on various service levels. This is a reasonable proposition because it is unlikely that all organizations subscribed to the service are likely to need it at the same time. It also allows the provider to offer the service at an affordable cost. However, in a large-scale incident that affects a wide area, it is likely that these facilities will become over-subscribed due to multiple customers claiming the same backup site. To gain priority in service over other customers, an organization can request a Priority Service from the provider, which often includes a higher monthly fee. This commercial site can also be used as a company's secondary production site with a full scale mirroring environment for their primary data center. Again, a higher fee will be required; but the cost could be justified by the security and resiliency of the site, which would give that organization the ability to provide its users with uninterrupted access to their data and applications.

== The role of data backups ==
Backup sites depend on reliable data backup processes to be effective. Organizations commonly use full, incremental, and differential backups, as well as snapshot and replication technologies, to protect information stored in servers, databases, and cloud platforms. These backups are usually stored off‑site or in cloud storage to prevent them from being lost in the same event that affects the primary location.

Regular backups support fast recovery by providing recent copies of important data that can be restored at the backup site. If backups are old, incomplete, or not tested, the organization may not be able to restart systems correctly even if the backup site itself is available. Many standards and frameworks for business continuity, such as ISO 22301, encourage regular backup testing and documentation of backup schedules.

== Planning and design ==
Designing a backup site is part of a broader continuity planning process that starts with risk assessment and business impact analysis (BIA). The BIA identifies which business processes are most critical, how much downtime they can tolerate, and what resources they need to function. This information helps planners decide which systems must be replicated at the backup site and which can be restored later.

Other design considerations include the physical location of the backup site, such as its distance from the primary site, access to transportation, power grid stability, and exposure to regional threats like hurricanes or earthquakes. The site should be far enough away that the same local event will not damage both locations, but close enough that staff and equipment can move there when needed. Network connectivity, bandwidth, and latency are also important, especially for hot sites that rely on real‑time data replication.

== Maintenance ==
Organizations should test their backup sites regularly to make sure everything works as expected. This includes checking that equipment is ready, data can be restored, and staff know what to do. Regular testing helps find problems early and ensures the organization can recover quickly during a real disaster.

Maintenance involves more than just testing. Organizations need to keep software, hardware, and backup data up to date. For example, computers and servers at the backup site should have the latest updates installed, and backup copies of data should be refreshed frequently. This ensures that, when the site is needed, it has the most recent information and can operate without technical issues.

Testing can involve simple drills, such as moving some operations to the backup site for a few hours, or full-scale simulations where the main site is temporarily shut down. During these exercises, organizations can check things like network connectivity, power systems, and communication channels. They can also confirm that staff understand their roles and can access necessary resources. Regular maintenance and testing together help reduce surprises, prevent equipment failures, and allow recovery to happen as smoothly as possible.

== Cloud backup sites ==
Many organizations have adopted cloud computing as a way to build flexible backup and recovery options. Cloud providers offer infrastructure and platform services that can be used as virtual backup sites, often with tools for automated replication and failover. Instead of maintaining a second physical data center, organizations can use cloud regions in different geographic areas to host standby systems and storage.

Hybrid strategies are also common, where critical systems use a hot site or highly available cloud setup, while less critical systems rely on warm or cold arrangements. As cyber threats such as ransomware grow, many organizations combine backup sites with strong cybersecurity measures, including network segmentation, immutable backups, and incident response plans, to improve overall resilience.

== The importance of planning ahead ==
Backup sites help protect against disaster, but they are not free. Organizations need to balance cost and risk when choosing a site. Hot sites cost the most but provide the fastest recovery, while cold sites are cheaper but slower. Warm sites fall in between. By planning ahead and understanding their own risk levels, companies can make better decisions about which type of site is right for them. In some cases, investing in a slightly more expensive site may save far more in lost revenue and downtime if a disaster happens.

== See also ==
- Off-site Data Protection
- Backup

== General references ==
- Records Management Services (2004, July 15). Vital Records: How Do You Protect And Store Vital Records?
- Haag, Cummings, McCubbrey, Pinsonneult, and Donovan. (2004). Information Management Systems, For The Information Age. McGraw-Hill Ryerson.
- IT Service Continuity (2007, ITIL v3). IT Service Continuity. Retrieved from: http://itlibrary.org/index.php?page=IT_Service_Continuity_Management on 03SEP14
- The Three Stages of Disaster Recovery Sites by Bryce CarrollNovember 20th, 2013
