= StorSimple =

- Type: Private
- Industry: Data storage
- Founded: 2009; 17 years ago
- Headquarters: Santa Clara, California, U.S.
- Key people: Ursheet Parikh; Co-founder & CEO
- Website: www.storsimple.com

StorSimple was a privately held company based in Santa Clara, California, marketing cloud storage. It was funded by venture capital from Index Ventures, Redpoint Ventures, Ignition Partners, and Mayfield Fund for a total of $31.5 million.

== History ==
StorSimple was founded in 2009 by former Cisco Systems and Brocade Communications Systems executives Ursheet Parikh and Guru Pangal. StorSimple marketed a cloud storage gateway computer appliance called Cloud-integrated Storage (CiS). Their approach claimed to integrate primary storage data deduplication, automated tiered storage of data (across local and cloud storage), data compression, encryption, and significantly faster data backup and disaster recovery times.

StorSimple was certified for Microsoft Windows Server 2008 and VMware. It integrated with cloud storage from Amazon, Google, Microsoft and Rackspace. In 2012 StorSimple was considered to be at the forefront of its genre.

The appliance had an iSCSI interface using 10 Gigabit Ethernet and used serial ATA disks as well as solid-state drives. In April 2012, StorSimple announced the replacement of its 2U 5010 (2.5 TB raw capacity) and 7010 (5 TB raw) models: the 5020 with 2 TB of raw capacity, the 7020 (4 TB), 5520 (10 TB) and the 4U 7520 (20 TB).

On October 16, 2012, Microsoft agreed to acquire StorSimple. It was finalized by November 15.

== Integration ==
After acquisition, Microsoft integrated StorSimple into its Azure product suite and refreshed the hardware, launching the 8100 and 8600 on-premise fixed-configuration storage arrays in 2014. The 8100 offered between 10 TB and 40 TB locally depending on data compression and data de-duplication and up to 200 TB maximum capacity inclusive of the Azure cloud storage. The 8600 offered 40 TB to 100 TB locally and 500 TB inclusive of cloud storage. Like their predecessors, the appliances combined solid state and standard disk drives. A virtualised version of the platform, running on a virtual machine in the Azure cloud, was initially marketed as the 1100 then re-branded as the 8010. In 2015 this was replaced by the 8020, offering 64 TB maximum, compared to its predecessor's 30 TB.

== Recognition ==
- Gartner Research "Cool Vendor in Storage Technologies, 2010"
- Dow Jones/VentureWire "Top 50 Startups to Watch” 2010 (only cloud storage on list)
- Most Promising Cloud Solution at the UP Cloud Computing Conference 2010
- Storage Magazine Gold Award for 2011 Product of the Year, storage systems category
- Microsoft BizSpark Partner of the Year 2011
- Grand Prize for Best of Show – Interop Japan 2011
- Bronze award "Best Storage Hardware" by SQL Server Magazine 2011
- CRN 10 Coolest Storage Startups / Emerging Vendors 2012

== See also ==
- Cloud computing
