= Global file system =

Type of computer storage

In computer storage, a global file system is a distributed file system that can be accessed from multiple locations, typically across a wide-area network, and provides concurrent access to a global namespace from all locations. In order for a file system to be considered global, it must allow for files to be created, modified, and deleted from any location. This access is typically provided by a cloud storage gateway at each edge location, which provides access using the NFS or SMB network file sharing protocols.

There are a number of benefits to using a global file system. First, global file systems can improve the availability of data by allowing multiple copies to be stored in different locations, as well as allowing for rapid restoration of lost data from a remote location. This can be helpful in the event of a disaster, such as a power outage or a natural disaster. Second, global file systems can improve performance by allowing data to be cached closer to the users who are accessing it. This can be especially beneficial in cases where data is accessed by users in different parts of the world. Finally, in contrast to traditional Network attached storage, global file systems can improve the ability of users to collaborate across multiple sites, in a manner similar to Enterprise file synchronization and sharing.

== History ==
The term global file system has historically referred to a distributed virtual name space built on a set of local file systems to provide transparent access to multiple, potentially distributed, systems. These global file systems had the same properties such as blocking interface, no buffering etc. but guaranteed that the same path name corresponds to the same object on all computers deploying the filesystem. Also called distributed file systems these file systems rely on redirection to distributed systems, therefore latency and scalability can affect file access depending on where the target systems reside.

The Andrew File System attempted to solve this for a campus environment using caching and a weak consistency model to achieve local access to remote files.

In the 2000s, global file systems have found a use case in providing hybrid cloud storage, that combine cloud or any object storage, versioning and local caching to create a single, unified, globally accessible file system that does not rely on redirection to a storage device but serves files from the local cache while maintaining the single file system and all meta data in the object storage. As described in Google's patents, advantages of these global file systems include the ability to scale with the object storage, use snapshots stored in the object storage for versioning to replace backup, and create a centrally managed consolidated storage repository in the object storage.

== Comparison with Network Attached Storage ==
When it comes to hybrid file storage, there are two main approaches: network attached storage (NAS) with cloud connectivity and global file system (GFS). The two solutions are fundamentally different.

NAS with cloud connectivity is typically used to supplement on-premises storage. Public clouds may be combined with on-premises NAS for tasks such as backup, tiering, or disaster recovery. This type of setup uses the cloud for specific use cases to complement on-premises storage. On-premises NAS is sold by well-established IT vendors including Dell, IBM, NetApp, and others, and most build in support for some type of cloud connectivity.

A Global File System utilizes a fundamentally different architecture. In these solutions, cloud storage – typically object storage – serves as the core storage element, while caching devices are utilized on-premises to provide data access. These devices can be physical but are increasingly available as virtual solutions that can be deployed in a hypervisor. The use of caching devices reduces the amount of required on-premises storage capacity, and the associated capital expense.

Global file systems are better suited for remote collaboration, as they make it easier to manage access to files across dispersed geographic areas. Utilizing the cloud as a central storage location enables users to access the same data regardless of their location.

There are some trade-offs to consider when choosing a GFS solution, however. One trade off is that because the gold copy of data is stored off-site, there may be latency issues when retrieving infrequently accessed files.

== Vendors ==
Notable vendors in the global filesystem area include:

- CTERA Networks
- Nasuni
- Panzura
- Hammerspace
- Peer Software

== See also ==
- Clustered file system
- Distributed file system
- Shared memory
