= Storage Resource Broker =

Storage Resource Broker (SRB) is data grid management computer software used in computational science research projects. SRB is a logical distributed file system based on a client-server architecture which presents users with a single global logical namespace or file hierarchy. Essentially, the software enables a user to use a single mechanism to work with multiple data sources.

== Description ==
SRB provides a uniform interface to heterogeneous computer data storage resources over a network. As part of this, it implements a logical namespace (distinct from physical file names) and maintains metadata on data-objects (files), users, groups, resources, collections, and other items in an SRB metadata catalog (MCAT) stored in a relational database management system. System and user-defined metadata can be queried to locate files based on attributes as well as by name. SRB runs on various versions of Unix, Linux, and Microsoft Windows.

The SRB system is middleware in the sense that it is built on top of other major software packages (various storage systems, real-time data sources, a relational database management system, etc.) and it has callable library functions that can be utilized by higher level software. However, it is more complete than many middleware software systems as it implements a comprehensive distributed data management environment, including various end-user client applications. It has features to support the management and collaborative (and controlled) sharing, publication, replication, transfer, and preservation of distributed data collections.

SRB is sometimes used in conjunction with computational grid computing systems, such as Globus Alliance, and can utilize the Globus Alliance Grid Security Infrastructure (GSI) authentication system.

SRB can store and retrieve data in archival storage systems such as the High Performance Storage System and SAM-FS, on disk file systems (Unix, Linux, or Windows), as binary large objects or tabular data in relational database management systems, and on tape libraries.

SRB was used since 1997. In 2008 the SRB was estimated to be managing over two petabytes of data.

While licensed, SRB source distributions are freely available to academic and non-profit organizations. Nirvana SRB, a commercial version of SRB, featured capabilities specifically adapted to government and commercial use.

== History ==
SRB development began in 1995, through the cooperative efforts of General Atomics, the Data Intensive Cyber Environments Group (DICE), and the San Diego Supercomputer Center (SDSC) at the University of California, San Diego (UCSD) with the support of the National Science Foundation (NSF).

SRB builds on the work of Reagan Moore. Moore, a doctorate in plasma physics from UCSD and former computational plasma physicist at General Atomics, joined the San Diego Supercomputer Center at its inception. A project for a distributed object computation testbed was funded by DARPA and the US Patent and Trademark Office in 1998 and 1999.

In 2003, General Atomics was granted an exclusive license from UCSD to develop SRB for commercial applications. New versions were announced in 2008 and 2012.

The integrated Rule-Oriented Data management System (iRODS) is a follow-on project of the SDSC SRB team (which became the Data Intensive Cyber Environments group), and largely replaced the use of SRB. iRODS is based on SRB concepts but was completely re-written, includes a highly-configurable rule engine at its core and is fully open source. Conferences in 2011 included demonstrations of iRODS.
