= Dynamic replication =

Dynamic replication may refer to:

- Dynamic replication (finance)
- Data grid § Dynamic replication
