= Mobile cloud storage =

Using cloud storage on mobile phones

Mobile cloud storage is a form of cloud storage that is accessible on mobile devices such as laptops, tablets, and smartphones. Mobile cloud storage providers offer services that allow the user to create and organize files, folders, music, and photos, similar to other cloud computing models. Services are used by both individuals and companies. Most cloud file storage providers offer limited free use but charge for additional storage once the free limit is exceeded. These costs are usually charged as a monthly subscription rate and have different rates depending on the amount of storage desired.

In 2018, cloud services revenue was about $182.4 billion and in 2022 it is projected to grow to $331.2 billion. The cloud storage industry was projected to grow 17.2 percent in 2019 (Costello, 2019).

== History ==
The concept of cloud computing traces back to 1960s, when the groundwork for modern internet and network technologies was being laid (Human for humans, 2024). One of the pivotal figures in this early period was J.C.R. Licklider, a visionary computer scientist who worked on ARPANET, the precursor to the internet. Licklider's ideas set the stage for the development of distributed computing systems, which are fundamental to cloud computing. Moving into the 1990s, AT&T introduced PersonaLink Services, a more advanced online platform offering electronic mail and online storage.

Major turning point in 2006

The launch of Amazon Web Services (AWS) in 2006 marked a major turning point. AWS introduced Amazon S3 (Simple Storage Service), which allowed businesses and developers to store and retrieve any amount of data, at any time, from anywhere on the web. This development was revolutionary, providing scalable, reliable, and low-cost data storage infrastructure that transformed how organizations managed their data.

== Applications ==
Some mobile device manufacturers include mobile cloud storage apps with their product. These apps facilitate synchronization of user files across multiple platforms. Part of the process for setting up new mobile devices frequently includes configuring a cloud storage service to Backup the device's files and information. Apple iOS devices come pre-loaded and configured to use Apple's mobile cloud storage service iCloud. Google offers a similar feature with the Android operating system by backing up the device using a Google Drive account. The Samsung Galaxy smartphone has partnered with Dropbox, while Microsoft similarly offers Microsoft OneDrive.

Some mobile cloud storage apps are platform-independent. For example, Nasuni's Mobile Access app is available on any Android or iOS device.

Most companies offering cloud storage have websites secured through HTTPS to access files allowing use on any device that can browse the Internet.

== See also ==
- Document collaboration – Several people working on a shared document
- Comparison of file hosting services
