= Enterprise file synchronization and sharing =

Software services used by companies

Enterprise file synchronization and sharing (also known as EFSS and enterprise file sync and share) refers to software services that enable organizations to securely synchronize and share documents, photos, videos and files from multiple devices with employees, and external customers and partners. Organizations often adopt these technologies to prevent employees from using consumer-based file sharing apps to store, access and manage corporate data that is outside of the IT department's control and visibility.

== Key characteristics ==
EFSS applications are often characterized by having most or all of the following features and capabilities:

- Sync files stored in corporate storage to user desktops and devices
- Send links to large files with support for multiple file extensions and protocols
- Integration to existing business applications via APIs, plugins and mobile apps
- Built-in file creation, editing and previewing
- User access permissions to files and folders
- Protection of files stored and transferred by encryption, antivirus scanning, and DLP (data loss prevention)
- Publish links to files with the ability to set a login requirement to access data
- Authentication options for Active Directory, SAML, Azure Active Directory, etc.
- Schedule and automate file transfers from automated systems and repositories
- Audit and report file activities and system actions

Depending on what an EFSS provider offers, services can be deployed using cloud computing, on-premises, or hybrid. According to Forrester Research, some EFSS providers can provide the ability to lockdown data in certain geographies for companies that have requirements to store content/metadata in specific jurisdictions.

== History ==
Box, one of the first EFSS products, was originally developed as a college project of Aaron Levie while he was a student of the University of Southern California in 2004. Levie left school to run the company full-time in 2005.

In 2007 Dropbox was founded, and officially launched at 2008's TechCrunch Disrupt conference. The same year, Microsoft began beta testing of Windows Live Folders, a predecessor of OneDrive.

Around 2010, the EFSS market emerged with over 100 vendors from a variety technology backgrounds including backup and cloud storage (Citrix ShareFile, Syncplicity), managed file transfer (Accellion, Biscom, Box, Hightail, Thru), enterprise content management and more. Many were developed as alternatives to consumer file sync and sharing services that did not have security features in place to protect company information nor the flexibility to integrate with existing content repositories and business applications.

In October 2011, software company, Citrix Systems, announced that it had acquired private enterprise file sync and share service, ShareFile, to add to the Citrix product line. ShareFile was a competitor of Box and Dropbox but focused on selling its product to IT departments of large organizations.

In 2012, CTERA Networks entered the EFSS market.

On June 25, 2014, Google announced at its I/O Conference that it was entering the enterprise file sharing market with the release of “Google Drive for Work.”

In July 2015, one EFSS vendor, Syncplicity, was sold to private equity firm, Skyview Capital, by previous owner, EMC Corporation.

== Standardisation ==
Open Cloud Mesh (OCM) is proposed to standardise EEFS. "It has similarities with authorization flows such as OAuth, as well as with social internet protocols such as ActivityPub and email". OCM is designed to notify a receiving party that they have been granted access to some resource, including but not limited to file transfers. It handles interactions up to the point where the receiving party is informed of their access to the resource.

The standardisation process began in January 2015, when ownCloud initiated an idea to interconnect the individual private cloud domains at the server-side in order to provide federated sharing functionalities between different administrative domains, calling this proposal known as Open Cloud Mesh, with an initial implementation draft dating July 2015, with implementations appearing in the market featuring a 1.0-proposal1 OCM API version, prior to official standardization.

In January 2020, a consortium of NRENs and independent actors of the community of Cloud Storage Services for Synchronization and Sharing (CS3), led by CERN, kick-started the CS3MESH4EOSC project, which resulted in June 2020: in the 1.0.0 release of the OCM API being published.

A W3C Community Group was launched in October 2023, which published a new version of the specification in November 2024 adopting the a new version was published in the IETF Internet-Draft format.
