= Biscom =

- Type: Private
- Industry: Software
- Founded: 1986; 40 years ago
- Founder: S.K. Ho 何曙光
- Headquarters: Westford, Massachusetts, United States
- Key people: S.K. Ho (Chairman)
- Owner: Concord Technologies; (2024–present)
- Website: www.biscom.com

Biscom, Inc. is a privately held software company founded in 1986. Headquartered in Westford, MA, its main focus is providing secure document delivery solutions to regulated industries.

In March 2024, it was announced that the firm was acquired by Concord Technologies.

== Overview ==
The company develops and markets fax server solutions that facilitate inbound and outbound electronic fax communications, as well as managed file transfer, enterprise file synchronization and sharing, and document conversion solutions. It has the ability to deliver millions of documents per day.

Founder and current Chairman of Biscom, S.K. Ho was previously the Director of Engineering at Wang Laboratories, where he designed and developed the Wang Word Processor and Wang Professional Image Systems; he holds nine major patents. Ho earned a BSME from Ordinance Engineering College in Taiwan and an MSEE from Drexel University.

== Biscom Launches Fax Server Industry ==
Recognizing the opportunity to combine facsimile communications with computer applications, S.K. Ho left Wang Laboratories to found Biscom, Inc., and thus he launched the fax server industry. Early application of Biscom's fax server, the FAXCOM Server, applied print output from mainframe applications to an electronic form, and merged this into a single TIFF document which could be delivered electronically via fax. This was a vast improvement over earlier processes in which the mainframe data would be printed to paper forms, and then mailed or sent via paper fax machine.

== Fax Server Industry Evolves ==
Fax servers have continually evolved since 1986, supporting desktop faxing via email, via Web browser, via mobile applications, and via Application Programming Interfaces (APIs); integrating with directory services such as Microsoft's Active Directory (and formerly Novell's eDirectory); integrating with Voice over IP (VoIP) to support T.38 Fax over IP (FoIP); supporting paper-based faxing via multi function printers; enabling fax workflows with support for Optical Character Recognition (OCR) and barcode interpretation for rules based fax routing; and offering fax server capabilities in both premises and hosted solutions.

== Biscom Expands Product Lines ==
Biscom has evolved into a provider of multiple product lines, including Managed File Transfer that enable secure and auditable delivery of files of all types and sizes, and document conversion that convert to and from popular formats such as PCL (Printer Command Language), PostScript, PDF (Portable Document Format), and Microsoft Office, and Enterprise File Synchronization & Sharing that enable full IT control of data and user manageability. Biscom currently offers secure document delivery solutions that support multiple modes of transmission, document types, and workflow automation.

== Notes ==
- Network World: File Transfer Solutions Take Pressure Off e-mail
- Windows IT Pro: Microsoft TechEd 2007
- Ferris Research: Assured Delivery for emails and Files
- Linux Journal: Product of the Day: FAXCOM Server on Linux
- Educause Quarterly: Managing Large Volumes of Assignments
- Network Computing: Fax Servers – Fast, Efficient, and Very Much Alive
- "ENT - Through the Test Track - Fax Server Testing Data - Technology Information". Vol. 3, no. 12. Archived from the original on May 26, 2006 – via FindArticles.
- Windows NT: The Fax Stops Here
- Linux Fax Software
- Technobabble - Fax Servers: Taming the Beast Once and For All
- InformIt: Fax Servers - Serving Faxes More than Ever
- Owen, Jeff, Telecom Reseller Reporter, Biscom: FoIP, September 10, 2012 Fax/FoIP
- Novell: FAXCOM - All for One and One for All

== See also ==
- Fax server
- Enterprise File Synchronization and Sharing (EFSS)
