= Infinite Disk =

Infinite Disk is a hierarchical storage management (HSM) and backup utility for MS-DOS, Windows, and OS/2 published by Chili Pepper Software of Atlanta in 1992. Infinite Disk introduced HSM, previously limited to mainframes, to personal computers. A variant of Infinite Disk, Personal Archiver, was bundled with Iomega removable drives starting in November 1994. The company and the software were acquired by Cheyenne Software in 1995, which was in turn purchased by Computer Associates in 1996.

Infinite Disk, operating in the background, automatically compresses less-active files and eventually migrates them to removable media, but the files remain visible in Windows folders and, when accessed, are fetched from the backup storage.
