= Nasuni =

American hybrid cloud storage company

Nasuni Corporation
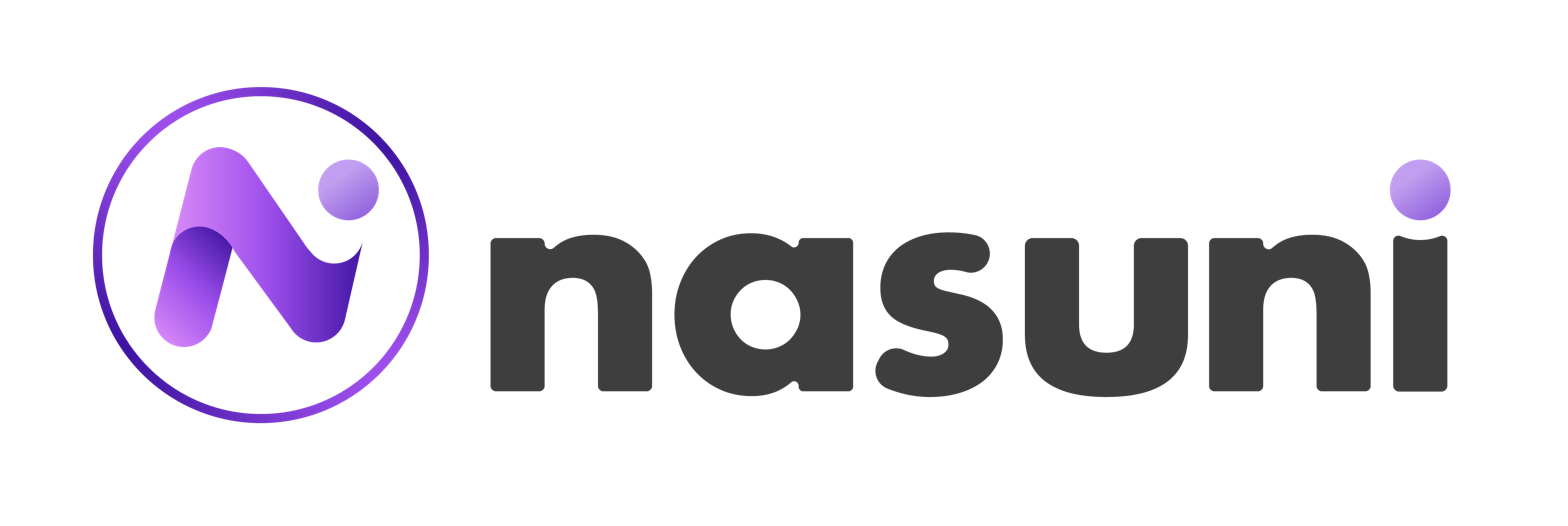
- Type: Private
- Industry: Hybrid cloud storage
- Founded: 2009; 17 years ago
- Founders: Andres Rodriguez; Rob Mason
- Headquarters: Boston, Massachusetts, U.S.
- Area served: Americas, EMEA, Asia-Pacific
- Key people: Sam King (CEO); David Castignola (CRO); Nick Burling (CPO); Jerry Carter (CTO); Ross Grainger (CFO)
- Number of employees: 697 (2026)
- Website: nasuni.com

Nasuni Corporation is a privately held hybrid cloud storage company with headquarters in Boston, Massachusetts.

== History ==
Nasuni was founded in 2009, and has raised approximately $169M, with the last funding a $25M investment in which all previous investors participated, including Goldman Sachs, Telstra Ventures, and Northbridge Venture Partners.

In the time since Nasuni requested a patent on UniFS in November 2013, the company has expanded its access to cloud storage infrastructure, as well as its on-premises edge appliance offerings, which provide local access to content stored in Nasuni-managed cloud storage.

On 14 July 2020, Nasuni Corp. collected $25 million in a new round of funding, plus an additional $15 million debt facility, and upgraded its cloud file storage platform to support remote workers.

In May 2022, Nasuni acquired the technology assets of DBM Cloud Systems in order to provide enhanced data migration and cloud portability features.

In June of 2022, Nasuni acquired Storage Made Easy, a file data management company, for an undisclosed sum.

In July 2024, Nasuni announced a strategic growth investment led by Vista Equity Partners, a global investment firm focused exclusively on enterprise software, data, and technology-enabled businesses. Vista was joined by TCV and KKR in the new investment, which valued Nasuni at approximately $1.2 billion.

In April 2025, Sam King became CEO. Former CEO Paul Flanagan continues as a member of the Board of Directors.

In March 2026, Nasuni acquired Resilio, Inc. Resilio delivers high-performance data movement solutions built on a modern architecture that enables enterprises to move faster, unlocking competitive advantage through superior data accessibility at any scale. Resilio’s Active Everywhere Platform enables demanding data-intensive workflows for leading organizations in architecture and engineering, media and entertainment, and financial services.

In August 2026, Nasuni acquired DryvIQ, a provider of intelligent unstructured data management. DryvIQ uses AI to discover, classify, and manage data across more than 550 file formats and 175 languages. The platform identifies sensitive data, supports regulatory compliance and AI initiatives, and helps eliminate redundant, obsolete, and non-critical data.

In October 2026, Nasuni introduced AI Activate, which turns file data already consolidated on Nasuni into a governed source that any MCP-compatible AI app or agent (such as Anthropic Claude, OpenAI ChatGPT, or Microsoft Copilot) can query. Before retrieval, each request is automatically limited to what the signed-in user already has permission to access.

== Technology ==
The firm's storage software uses object storage, file caching appliances, and the company's proprietary UniFS global file system to offer a cloud solution that replaces traditional file servers and Network Attached Storage (NAS). Nasuni integrates with public cloud storage platforms, such as Google Cloud Storage, Amazon Web Services, and Microsoft Azure, and private cloud storage platforms such as IBM Cloud Object Storage and EMC Elastic Cloud Storage (ECS). Such storage platforms provide an object-based storage infrastructure, on top of which UniFS creates a complete versioned file system. The Nasuni platform stores customer data as a sequence of snapshots that include every version of every file. The firm has demonstrated the ability to store more than one billion objects in a single storage volume.

Nasuni Edge Appliances run in the public cloud or on-premises to provide shared access to cached copies of active files. These Appliances are typically deployed as virtual machines, running on existing infrastructure, including VMware, Nutanix hyper-converged infrastructure, and Microsoft Hyper-V. The Edge Appliances can also run in the cloud on Microsoft Azure, Amazon EC2, or Google Cloud Platform. Hardware appliance choices offered by Nasuni include systems with solid-state drives.

== Features ==
Nasuni’s File Data Platform provides a variety of services, including the following:

- Multi-site collaboration that enables multiple users in multiple locations to work on the same files.
- Global file lock to ensure that only one user is changing a file at a time.
- Global file acceleration that optimizes the distribution of files to users.
- Access Anywhere to enable users to access the files they need from any location.
- Rapid recovery from ransomware attacks.
- Professional services to assist with migrating data to cloud storage.

== Patents ==
Nasuni holds a number of patents for technologies that support the Nasuni enterprise file services platform, including:

- Method and system for interfacing to cloud storage.
- Versioned file system with pruning
- Versioned file system with sharing.
- Versioned file system with fast restore.
- Cloud-native global file system with multi-site support using push classes.
- Network accessible file server.
- Versioned file system with global lock.
- Systems and methods for restoring an interface to a global file system.
- Versioned file system using structured data representations.
- Cloud-native global file system with constant-time rekeying.
- Cloud-native global file system with reshapable caching.

== Awards ==
Nasuni has earned several awards for technology and customer service, including the following:

- CRMI Honors 27 Service Organizations for Delivering ‘World-Class’ Customer Service.
- Storage Magazine's Storage Awards 2024: Cloud Enabler of the Year.
- Silver Product of the Year Award for Cloud Storage, by Storage Magazine and SearchStorage.
- NorthFace ScoreBoard Award for Customer Service, by the Customer Relationship Management Institute LLC.

== Origin of "Nasuni" ==
The company name "NASUNI" is shorthand for Andres Rodriguez's original idea for the company: "NAS UNIfied".
