= Panzura =

American software company

- Type: Private
- Industry: Information technology
- Founded: 2008
- Founders: Randy Chou; John Taylor
- Headquarters: San Francisco, California, United States
- Key people: Karthik Ramamurthy (CEO); Guy Churchward (Chairman)
- Products: Panzura CloudFS; Panzura Nexus; Panzura Symphony
- Number of employees: 280
- Website: panzura.com

Panzura is a privately owned American software company based in San Francisco, California, that provides hybrid-cloud data management software and services for the enterprise software market. Its software helps users access, manage, analyze, and store unstructured data using techniques in distributed data consolidation, artificial intelligence, and network load balancing.

The company's core offering is a global file system promoted as a unified data engine. It supports large-scale multi-site data workflows and applications in the cloud, and has data protection and disaster recovery capabilities derived from its Immutable object architecture. Panzura licenses software as a service data management and data analytics services for observability, search and auditing over data and storage infrastructure.

== History ==
Panzura was founded in 2008 by Randy Chou and John Taylor, who were both members of the founding software team at Aruba Networks. The company was initially funded by Matrix Partners, Khosla Ventures, and Chevron Technology Ventures, the corporate venture arm of Chevron Corporation. Panzura received $15 million in funding in 2012, followed by a $25 million funding round in 2013 which included Meritech Capital Partners. SanDisk became a strategic investor in 2013, with Alex Lam joining as a board observer.

Panzura was acquired outright in 2020 by Chicago-based private equity firm Profile Capital Management. After most executives were replaced, it reorganized under new management and in 2021, the company announced a new brand image.

== Products ==
Panzura CloudFS is a hybrid cloud file services platform that uses cloud object storage. It overcomes latency to provide users with simultaneous, real-time access to petabyte-size files from any widely distributed location. It is used to migrate or re-platform data, workloads and applications to the cloud, and to consolidate data across multiple on-premises servers and the cloud, without having to refresh existing IT systems. CloudFS integrates with public and private cloud object storage platforms including Amazon Web Services, Microsoft Azure, IBM Cloud Object Storage, EMC Atmos, Google Cloud Platform, Virtustream, Scality, Cloudian and Wasabi Technologies.

Panzura Data Services is a multi-cloud management and data analysis overlay to CloudFS. It offers a unified view and management of unstructured data, whether it is stored in a cloud, on premises in a data center, or at the edge. It also offers search, audit, and audit alerting capabilities.

Panzura Detect and Rescue is a ransomware detection overlay to Data Services. It detects and interdicts ransomware attacks within CloudFS.

Panzura Edge adds remote and mobile user access and enterprise file sync and share capabilities to CloudFS, using the same authoritative data source.

Panzura Symphony is a data services platform that provides data visibility, metadata awareness, and data motion. It unifies unstructured data across cloud and on-premises storage and uses metadata to extract intelligence, enable tagging, and automate data movement based on policies.

As of March 2024, Panzura holds 37 patents,

Panzura has FIPS 140-3 security certification from the National Institute of Standards and Technology (NIST) for use by U.S. government agencies and contractors. Panzura provides secure-erase capabilities for data destruction in compliance with guidelines for media sanitization as set out in the NIT special publication 800-88.
