= Amazon Elastic File System =

Cloud-based storage service

Amazon Elastic File System (EFS)
- Developer(s): Amazon.com
- Initial release: June 29, 2016; 8 years ago.
- Operating system: Cross-platform
- Available in: English
- Type: Cloud Storage
- License: Proprietary
- Website: aws.amazon.com/efs/

Amazon Elastic File System (Amazon EFS) is a cloud storage service provided by Amazon Web Services (AWS) designed to provide scalable, elastic, concurrent with some restrictions, and encrypted file storage for use with both AWS cloud services and on-premises resources. Amazon EFS is built to be able to grow and shrink automatically as files are added and removed. Amazon EFS supports Network File System (NFS) versions 4.0 and 4.1 (NFSv4) protocol, and control access to files through Portable Operating System Interface (POSIX) permissions.

== Use cases ==
According to Amazon, use cases for this file system service typically include content repositories, development environments, web server farms, home directories and big data applications.

== Data consistency ==
Amazon EFS provides open-after-close consistency semantics that applications expect from NFS.

== Availability ==
Amazon EFS is available in all the public AWS regions at least since December 2019.

== See also ==
- GlusterFS
- Red Hat Storage Server
