= CTERA Networks =

Multinational enterprise software company

CTERA
- Type: Private
- Industry: Cloud storage Cloud storage gateways Data protection Online backup service Data synchronization
- Key people: Liran Eshel (executive chairman); Aron Brand (CTO); Oded Nagel (CEO)
- Products: CTERA Edge Filer; CTERA Drive; CTERA Portal
- Website: www.ctera.com

CTERA Networks is a privately held enterprise software company headquartered in New York and Israel. The company has regional offices in the UK, Italy, France, Spain, Germany, and Australia.

CTERA has partnered with companies including Amazon Web Services, Hewlett Packard Enterprise, IBM, Hitachi Vantara and Cisco. Clients include Deutsche Telekom, Banco Santander, Axa and the United States Department of Defense. In October 2016 IBM became a CTERA reseller. IBM's Cloud Object Storage, integrated with the CTERA Enterprise File Services Platform, can be deployed on-premises, in the cloud or in a hybrid on-premises/cloud setup.

== History ==
CTERA was founded in 2008 by Liran Eshel and Zohar Kaufman.

As of 2018, CTERA has raised $100 million in funding from investors including Benchmark Capital, Venrock, Cisco Systems, Bessemer Venture Partners and Vintage Investment Partners.

In June 2016, CTERA earned a contract to provide a private cloud file sharing solution to the United States Department of Defense. As part of the agreement, CTERA and DISA (Defense Information Systems Agency) co-developed a mutual authentication technology using government-issued smart cards for additional layers of protection beyond the standard enterprise integration with Microsoft Active Directory servers.

In 2022, CTERA updated its Global File System, introducing enhanced capabilities for managing cloud storage, permanent data deletion, and other data protection features. The product was enhanced to includes new features such as cloud storage routing for more granular data management and control, as well as enterprise key management for cryptographic keys.

== Products ==
In 2009, CTERA released its first cloud storage gateway, the C200. The gateway combined the speed of local network storage with off-site cloud storage and backup technology. In 2010, CTERA released the C400 cloud storage gateway which added features for office server backup and recovery and collaboration capability for multiple users working on files stored in the cloud or on the gateway. In 2011, the C800 gateway was released with 24 TB of raw local storage. In 2016, CTERA announced a virtual cloud storage gateway that can be deployed from VMware or KVM servers that enabled customers to use existing hardware. CTERA released updates to its cloud storage gateway portfolio in April 2016 focused on efficiency and storage capacity.

CTERA released Enterprise File Sync and Share (EFSS) in 2012, which enabled users to access, share and collaborate on files from any location by storing files either locally or on the cloud. Also in 2012, CTERA launched a mobile app which made it possible to access files and backups on iOS and Android devices.

In December 2015, CTERA announced Cloud Server Data Protection, its storage-as-a-service server data protection software for enterprise CloudOps. Cloud Server Data Protection protects server data on a private or virtual private cloud using backup agents for Windows and Linux environments and object storage services through cloud platforms such as Amazon Web Services, Microsoft Azure, IBM Cloud and OpenStack-based clouds.

== See also ==
- Science and technology in Israel
- Hybrid cloud storage
- Cloud storage
- File sharing
- File synchronization
