= DryvIQ =

DryvIQ is a software application that discovers, classifies, and governs enterprise content across on-premises and cloud-based storage and content management systems, supporting use cases such as data migration, storage optimization, regulatory compliance, and preparing content for use with artificial intelligence systems.

== History ==
Before it was DryvIQ, the software SkySync was released in 2013 by Ann Arbor, Michigan based company, Portal Architects, Inc. The company created SkySync, a back-end, administrative application designed to transfer content across storage platforms, after abandoning 18 months of development on a desktop application called SkyBrary in 2011.

Between 2014 and 2015, Portal Architects established partnerships with the following companies: Autodesk, Box, Dropbox, Egnyte, EMC, Google, Syncplicity, Huddle, IBM, Microsoft, OpenText, Oracle, Citrix ShareFile, Hightail and Internet2.

SkySync (currently DryvIQ) was named a "Cool Vendor in Content Management" by Gartner in 2015.

In 2022, SkySync changed its name to DryvIQ, which is now what the company is currently known as.

The rebrand aligned with an expansion from file migration and synchronization into broader content governance spanning the full content lifecycle. The DryvIQ platform added capabilities for automated discovery, classification, and governance of enterprise content, supporting use cases such as storage optimization, regulatory compliance, risk management, and preparing content for use with artificial intelligence systems, including Microsoft 365 Copilot.

DryvIQ’s evolution toward intelligent data management is reflected in its portfolio of recent patents. In December 2022, the company was granted U.S. Patent No. 11,531,640, covering systems and methods for automatically discovering, classifying, and governing digital content, with an emphasis on sensitivity and classification. In March 2025, U.S. Patent No. 12,259,847 was issued, extending these protections to systems for intelligent digital item discovery, automated handling, and governance of content. In April 2025, U.S. Patent No. 12,287,761 was granted, addressing machine learning-based methods to classify digital content using file metadata. In July 2025, U.S. Patent No. 12,361,071 was issued for technology enabling machine learning-driven automated actions on digital content.

On August 27, 2026, DryvIQ was acquired by Nasuni.
