= High Performance Storage System =

Digital storage system

- Developers: HPSS Collaboration (IBM, LANL, LBNL, LLNL, SNL)
- Stable release: 12.1 / July 2026
- Operating system: Linux
- Type: Hierarchical Storage Management
- License: Proprietary
- Website: hpss-collaboration

High Performance Storage System (HPSS) is a flexible, scalable, policy-based, software-defined hierarchical storage management (HSM) product developed by the HPSS Collaboration. It provides scalable HSM, archive, and file system services using cluster, LAN and storage area network (SAN) technologies to aggregate the capacity and performance of many computers, disks, disk systems, tape drives, and tape libraries.

== Architecture ==
HPSS supports a variety of methods for accessing and creating data. Among them are support for FTP, parallel FTP, FUSE (Linux), S3 object store data transfer protocol, as well as a robust client C- and Python-based API with support for parallel I/O.

HPSS is fully supported on Red Hat Linux. The HPSS client API is supported on several Linux distros.

The backend metadata store is built atop IBM's Db2, a scalable relational database management system.

== The HPSS Collaboration ==
In early 1992, several United States Department of Energy (DOE) National Laboratories — Lawrence Livermore (LLNL), Los Alamos (LANL), Oak Ridge (ORNL), and Sandia (SNL) — joined with IBM to form the National Storage Laboratory (NSL). The NSL's purpose was to commercialize software and hardware technologies that would overcome computing and data storage bottlenecks. The NSL's research on data storage gave birth to the collaboration which produces HPSS. This collaboration began in the fall of 1992 and involved IBM Consulting in Houston (née Global Business Services) and five DOE national labs (Lawrence Berkeley [LBL], LLNL, LANL, ORNL, and SNL). At that time, the HPSS design team at the DOE national laboratories and IBM recognized there would be a data storage explosion driven by computing power rising to teraflops/petaflops requiring data stored in HSMs to rise to petabytes and beyond, data transfer rates with the HSM to rise to gigabytes/s and higher, and daily throughput with a HSM in tens of terabytes per day. Therefore, the collaboration set out to design and deploy a system that would scale by a factor of 1,000 or more and evolve from the base above toward these expected targets and beyond.

The HPSS Collaboration is based on the premise that no single organization has the experience and resources to meet all the challenges represented by the growing imbalance between computing power and data collection capabilities, and storage system I/O, capacity, and functionality. Over twenty organizations worldwide including industry, US Department of Energy (DOE), other federal laboratories, universities, National Science Foundation (NSF) supercomputer centers, French Commissariat a l'Energie Atomique (CEA), and Gleicher Enterprises have contributed to various aspects of this effort.

In 2025, ORNL stopped participating in the HPSS Collaboration. As of November 2025, the primary HPSS development team consists of:

- IBM Consulting (Houston, TX) (formerly called IBM Global Business Services)
- Los Alamos National Laboratory (Los Alamos, NM)
- Lawrence Livermore National Laboratory (Livermore, CA)
- Lawrence Berkeley National Energy Research Scientific Computing Center (Berkeley, CA)
- Sandia National Laboratory (Albuquerque, NM)

== Notable achievements ==
- In March 2024, ECMWF became the first HPSS site to reach an exabyte of data stored in a single HPSS namespace.
- On November 14, 2007, the San Diego Supercomputer Center along with IBM, DataDirect, and Brocade demonstrated a "Billion File" test which successfully backed up a billion files from GPFS into HPSS.
- In May 2013 a 380 Petabyte HPSS installation entered service at the National Center for Supercomputing Applications (NCSA) at the University of Illinois at Urbana-Champaign.
