= Disk aggregation =

Disk aggregation is the abstraction of two or more hard disks, disk partitions, or other logical volumes into a single logical disk.

This is done to:

- create a single logical disk with a capacity larger than any of the available physical disks
- provide a simple way to increase disk performance
- provide a simple way to implement LUN-level storage virtualization

== See also ==
- RAID
