= Cloud storage =

Model of computer data storage

Cloud storage is a model of computer data storage in which data, said to be on "the cloud", is stored remotely in logical pools and is accessible to users over a network, typically the Internet. The physical storage spans multiple servers (sometimes in multiple locations), and the physical environment is typically owned and managed by a cloud computing provider. These cloud storage providers are responsible for keeping the data available and accessible, and the physical environment secured, protected, and running. People and organizations buy or lease storage capacity from the providers to store user, organization, or application data.

Cloud storage services may be accessed through a colocated cloud computing service, a web service application programming interface (API) or by applications that use the API, such as cloud desktop storage, a cloud storage gateway or Web-based content management systems.

== History ==
Cloud computing is believed to have been invented by J. C. R. Licklider in the 1960s with his work on ARPANET to connect people and data from anywhere at any time.

In 1983, CompuServe offered its consumer users a small amount of disk space that could be used to store any files they chose to upload.

In 1994, AT&T launched PersonaLink Services, an online platform for personal and business communication and entrepreneurship. The storage was one of the first to be all web-based, and referenced in their commercials as, "you can think of our electronic meeting place as the cloud." Amazon Web Services introduced their cloud storage service Amazon S3 in 2006, and has gained widespread recognition and adoption as the storage supplier to popular services such as SmugMug, Dropbox, and Pinterest. In 2005, Box announced an online file sharing and personal cloud content management service for businesses. Alibaba Cloud was launched in September 2009, three years after AWS. As of 2024, Gartner ranked cloud storage platforms as follows: AWS, Google, Microsoft, Oracle, Alibaba, IBM, Huawei and Tencent. These account for 97% of the global cloud services market. This rating was based on ability to execute in market and innovation vision. In 2023, 80% of China's technology companies and half of AI LLM companies ran on Alibaba Cloud while in the US dominance belonged to AWS with 31 to 50% share. In 2026, Alibaba is scheduled to spend more than 300 million yuan, about $52 billion, on artificial intelligence and cloud infrastructure over the next three years, a figure much larger than the amount spent the previous year. Data centers will also be expanding, and AI models like Qwen. Alibaba's CEO, Eddie Wu, describes the amount spent as the largest to date on cloud and AI. Also, he explained that they expect much of the internal AI workload to run on Alibaba Cloud. Some of Alibaba's AI tools, like Accio Work, combine local storage and cloud-based services, although a complete description of its technical architecture is not available.The desktop application can access files and create outputs. It can also maintain memory or activity data on the user's device. According to the privacy policy, Accio Work collects inputs, documents, communications, technical information, and account data, which may be processed by cloud-computing providers. Accio Work's privacy policy states that it collects users' inputs, documents, communications, technical information, and account data, and these may be processed by cloud-computing providers alongside local execution. The service is described as 'local-first' for file handling and task execution on a user's machine, while cloud infrastructure is used for account management, service delivery, communications, and some AI planning and model inference.Local space supports file handling and task execution, while cloud infrastructure supports accounts, service delivery, communications, and possibly AI planning. This division may depend upon which region the user is accessing the AI tool from. Spending will include specific items such as GPU-like accelerators and large-scale data centers to support internal workloads and external client functions, underscoring Alibaba's pivot from e-commerce to cloud infrastructure.

== Architecture ==
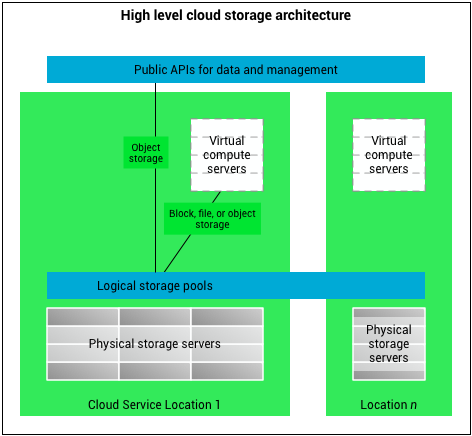
A high level architecture of cloud storage

Cloud storage is based on highly virtualized infrastructure and is like broader cloud computing in terms of interfaces, near-instant elasticity and scalability, multi-tenancy, and metered resources. Cloud storage services can be used from an off-premises service (Amazon S3) or deployed on-premises (ViON Capacity Services).

There are three types of cloud storage: a hosted object storage service, file storage, and block storage. Each of these cloud storage types offer their own unique advantages.

- Examples of object storage services that can be hosted and deployed with cloud storage characteristics include Amazon S3, Oracle Cloud Storage and Microsoft Azure Storage, object storage software like Openstack Swift, object storage systems like EMC Atmos, EMC ECS and Hitachi Content Platform, and distributed storage research projects like OceanStore and VISION Cloud. Alibaba Cloud is another example of object storage services or OSS that is fully managed, scalable, secure, and cost-effective cloud storage that is made for storing and accessing large amounts of unstructured data, similar to Amazon S3 and Microsoft Azure Storage. OSS supports bucket-based storage, global access and high durability, making it a standard cloud object storage platform.
- Examples of file storage services include Amazon Elastic File System (EFS) and Qumulo Core, used for applications that need access to shared files and require a file system. This storage is often supported with a Network Attached Storage (NAS) server, used for large content repositories, development environments, media stores, or user home directories.
- A block storage service like Amazon Elastic Block Store (EBS) is used for other enterprise applications like databases and often requires dedicated, low latency storage for each host. This is comparable in certain respects to direct attached storage (DAS) or a storage area network (SAN).

Cloud storage is:

- Made up of many distributed resources, but still acts as one, either in a federated or a cooperative storage cloud architecture
- Highly fault tolerant through redundancy and distribution of data
- Highly durable through the creation of versioned copies
- Typically eventually consistent with regard to data replicas

== Advantages ==
- Companies need only pay for the storage they actually use, typically an average of consumption during a month, quarter, or year. This does not mean that cloud storage is less expensive, only that it incurs operating expenses rather than capital expenses.
- Businesses using cloud storage can cut their energy consumption by up to 70% making them a more green business.
- Organizations can choose between off-premises and on-premises cloud storage options, or a mixture of the two options, depending on relevant decision criteria that is complementary to initial direct cost savings potential; for instance, continuity of operations (COOP), disaster recovery (DR), security (PII, HIPAA, SARBOX, IA/CND), and records retention laws, regulations, and policies.
- Storage availability and data protection are intrinsic to object storage architecture, so depending on the application, the additional technology, effort and cost to add availability and protection can be eliminated.
- Storage maintenance tasks, such as purchasing additional storage capacity, are offloaded to the responsibility of a service provider.
- Cloud storage provides users with immediate access to a broad range of resources and applications hosted in the infrastructure of another organization via a web service interface.
- Cloud storage can be used for copying virtual machine images from the cloud to on-premises locations or to import a virtual machine image from an on-premises location to the cloud image library. In addition, cloud storage can be used to move virtual machine images between user accounts or between data centers.
- Cloud storage can be used as natural disaster proof backup, as normally there are 2 or 3 different backup servers located in different places around the globe.
- Cloud storage can be mapped as a local drive with the WebDAV protocol. It can function as a central file server for organizations with multiple office locations.

== Potential concerns ==
=== Data security ===
Security of stored data and data in transit may be a concern when storing sensitive data at a cloud storage provider. Outsourcing data storage increases the attack surface area. Cloud storage is a rich resource for both hackers and national security agencies. Because the cloud holds data from many different users and organizations, hackers see it as a very valuable target.

1. When data has been distributed it is stored at more locations increasing the risk of unauthorized physical access to the data. For example, in cloud based architecture, data is replicated and moved frequently so the risk of unauthorized data recovery increases dramatically. Such as in the case of disposal of old equipment, reuse of drives, and reallocation of storage space. The manner that data is replicated depends on the service level a customer chooses and on the service provided. When encryption is in place it can ensure confidentiality. Crypto-shredding can be used when disposing of data (on a disk).
2. The number of people with access to the data who could be compromised (e.g., bribed, or coerced) increases dramatically. A single company might have a small team of administrators, network engineers, and technicians, but a cloud storage company will have many customers and thousands of servers, therefore a much larger team of technical staff with physical and electronic access to almost all of the data at the entire facility or perhaps the entire company. Decryption keys that are kept by the service user, as opposed to the service provider, limit access to data by service provider employees. As for sharing multiple data in the cloud with multiple users, a large number of keys has to be distributed to users via secure channels for decryption, also it has to be securely stored and managed by the users in their devices. Storing these keys requires rather expensive secure storage. To overcome that, key-aggregate cryptosystem can be used.
3. It increases the number of networks over which the data travels. Instead of just a local area network (LAN) or storage area network (SAN), data stored on a cloud requires a WAN (wide area network) to connect them both.
4. By sharing storage and networks with many other users/customers it is possible for other customers to access your data. Sometimes because of erroneous actions, faulty equipment, a bug and sometimes because of criminal intent. This risk applies to all types of storage and not only cloud storage. The risk of having data read during transmission can be mitigated through encryption technology. Encryption in transit protects data as it is being transmitted to and from the cloud service. Encryption at rest protects data that is stored at the service provider. Encrypting data in an on-premises cloud service on-ramp system can provide both kinds of encryption protection.

There are several options available to avoid security issues. One option is to use a private cloud instead of a public cloud. Another option is to ingest data in an encrypted format where the key is held within the on-premise infrastructure. To this end, access is often by use of on-premise cloud storage gateways that have options to encrypt the data prior to transfer.

=== Longevity ===
Companies are not permanent and the services and products they provide can change. Outsourcing data storage to another company needs careful investigation and nothing is ever certain. Contracts set in stone can be worthless when a company ceases to exist or its circumstances change. Companies can:

1. Go bankrupt.
2. Expand and change their focus.
3. Be purchased by other larger companies.
4. Be purchased by a company headquartered in or move to a country that negates compliance with export restrictions and thus necessitates a move.
5. Suffer an irrecoverable disaster.

=== Accessibility ===
- Performance for outsourced storage is likely to be lower than local storage, depending on how much a customer is willing to spend for WAN bandwidth
- Reliability and availability depend on wide area network availability and on the level of safety taken by the service provider. Reliability should be based on hardware as well as various algorithms used.

=== Limitations of Service Level Agreements ===
Typically, cloud storage Service Level Agreements (SLAs) do not encompass all forms of service interruptions. Exclusions typically include planned maintenance, downtime resulting from external factors such as network issues, human errors like misconfigurations, natural disasters, force majeure events, or security breaches. Typically, customers bear the responsibility of monitoring SLA compliance and must file claims for any unmet SLAs within a designated timeframe. Customers should be aware of how deviations from SLAs are calculated, as these parameters may vary by other services offered within the same provider. These requirements can place a considerable burden on customers. Additionally, SLA percentages and conditions can differ across various services within the same provider, with some services lacking any SLA altogether. In cases of service interruptions due to hardware failures in the cloud provider, service providers typically do not offer monetary compensation. Instead, eligible users may receive credits as outlined in the corresponding SLA.

=== Other concerns ===
- Users with specific records-keeping requirements, such as public agencies that must retain electronic records according to statute, may encounter complications with using cloud computing and storage. For instance, the U.S. Department of Defense designated the Defense Information Systems Agency (DISA) to maintain a list of records management products that meet all of the records retention, personally identifiable information (PII), and security (Information Assurance; IA) requirements
- Piracy and copyright infringement may be enabled by sites that permit filesharing. For example, the CodexCloud ebook storage site has faced litigation from the owners of the intellectual property uploaded and shared there, as have the Grooveshark and YouTube sites it has been compared to.
- The legal aspect, from a regulatory compliance standpoint, is of concern when storing files domestically and especially internationally.
- The resources used to produce large data centers, especially those needed to power them, are causing nations to drastically increase their energy production. This can lead to further climate damaging implications.

== Hybrid cloud storage ==
Hybrid cloud storage is a term for a storage infrastructure that uses a combination of on-premises storage resources with cloud storage. The on-premises storage is usually managed by the organization, while the public cloud storage provider is responsible for the management and security of the data stored in the cloud. Hybrid cloud storage can be implemented by an on-premises cloud storage gateway that presents a file system or object storage interface that users can access in the same way they would access a local storage system. The cloud storage gateway transparently transfers the data to and from the cloud storage service, providing low latency access to the data through a local cache.

Hybrid cloud storage can be used to supplement an organization's internal storage resources, or it can be used as the primary storage infrastructure. In either case, hybrid cloud storage can provide organizations with greater flexibility and scalability than traditional on-premises storage infrastructure.

There are several benefits to using hybrid cloud storage, including the ability to cache frequently used data on-site for quick access, while inactive cold data is stored off-site in the cloud. This can save space, reduce storage costs and improve performance. Additionally, hybrid cloud storage can provide organizations with greater redundancy and fault tolerance, as data is stored in both on-premises and cloud storage infrastructure.

== See also ==
- Block-level storage
- Cloud collaboration
- Cloud Data Management Interface, better known as CDMI
- Cloud database
- Comparison of online backup services
- File hosting service
- Mobile cloud storage
- Cooperative storage cloud
- Google Cloud Storage
- Cloud computing
- Cooperative storage cloud
- Fog computing
- Edge computing
- Mobile edge computing
- Dew computing
- Distributed networking
- Data cluster
- Directory
- File system
- Clustered file system
- Distributed file system
- Distributed file system for cloud
- Distributed data store
- Distributed database
- Cloud research
- In-memory database
- In-memory processing
- OneDrive
- Disk aggregation
- Logical disk
