= Kiteworks =

American technology company

- Type: Private
- Industry: Security software
- Founded: 1999; 27 years ago in Singapore
- Headquarters: San Mateo, California, United States
- Key people: Jonathan Yaron (CEO); Amit Toren (CBO); Michael Lee (CFO); Kurt Michael (CRO); Tim Freestone (CMO); Yaron Galant (CPO); Frank Balonis (CISO)
- Number of employees: 400+
- Website: kiteworks.com

Kiteworks, formerly known as Accellion, Inc., is an American technology company that secures sensitive content communications over channels such as email, file share, file transfer, managed file transfer, web forms, and application programming interfaces. It was founded in 1999 in Singapore and is now based in San Mateo, California.

The Kiteworks Private Data Network consolidates file and email data communications onto a single platform, enabling organizations to reduce data privacy exposure risk and demonstrate conformance with a variety of data privacy regulations.

== History ==
=== Accellion (1999–2021) ===
The company was founded as Accellion in Singapore in 1999 and was originally focused on distributed file storage. It moved to Palo Alto, California and shifted its focus on secure file transmission.

Accellion reached a total funding of about $35 million in 2011, and it was valued at $500 million in 2014. The company's chief executive officer, Yorgen Edholm, credited aversion to "National Security Agency—style snooping" as a factor in their success.

Accellion raised $12.2 million, in January 2012, from Riverwood Capital, to continue their expansion.

The company began focusing on security and compliance in 2016, and released features that included data security, governance, and compliance. They also began integrations with major cybersecurity independent software vendors (ISVs).

In April 2020, the company received $120 million investment from Bregal Sagemount. Later that year, a zero-day exploit in Accellion’s legacy File Transfer Appliance (FTA) product led to data breaches of dozens of government and private organizations. The vulnerabilities were confirmed only in the FTA and not in the Kiteworks platform, which has a separate codebase. Accellion later announced it would stop supporting its legacy FTA product starting April 30, 2021.

=== Kiteworks ===
Accellion was rebranded as Kiteworks in October 2021.

Kiteworks completed a SOC 2 Type II audit examination and received ISO/IEC 27001:2013, 27017:2015, and 27018:2019 certifications for its platform in October 2023. Unlike a Type I assessment, which reviews control design at a specific point in time, the SOC 2 Type II audit process involves an independent CPA firm evaluating the operational effectiveness of controls over a period of 3 to 12 months, typically including scoping, fieldwork, and evidence collection phases.

The company became an early signee of Cybersecurity and Infrastructure Security Agency's (CISA) Secure by Design Pledge in May 2024.

In August 2024, Kiteworks raised US$456 million from Insight Partners and Sixth Street, valuing it at over US$1 billion.

As of 2024, Kiteworks has over 100 million users, across over 3,800 organizations.

In March 2025, Kiteworks received Federal Information Processing Standard (FIPS) 140-3 validation for its cryptographic module, building upon its previous FIPS 140-2 certification. Additionally, its Secure Gov Cloud obtained FedRAMP High Ready status.

Following the company's 2025 acquisition of Zivver [nl], the Dutch investigative journalism outlet Follow the Money raised concerns that sensitive government and corporate data could be exposed under U.S. jurisdiction. Experts noted that several members of Kiteworks’ leadership are former personnel of Israel’s Unit 8200, an elite military intelligence unit, which could present potential security vulnerabilities.

== Software ==
Accellion was working on file transfer systems by late 2002. The company released a file transfer appliance in 2005, a physical machine aiming to reduce server load when sending large files.

In March 2011, the company released an online file collaboration product, emphasizing security.

In 2012, the company launched a service allowing file sharing between mobile devices. It included a synchronization feature called kitedrive. Early demand for the company's file transfer applications came from organizations that needed to transfer large files, including healthcare companies and universities.

In January 2014, Accellion launched Kiteworks, a file sharing product allowing users to edit files and projects remotely, with interoperability with services like Google Drive and Dropbox. That December, the company released a set of programming interfaces extending secure file access to mobile devices.

In June 2017, Kiteworks received FedRAMP Authorization for Moderate Level Impact of Controlled Unclassified Information (CUI). It has achieved FedRAMP certification every year since.

In November 2018, Kiteworks released the CISO Dashboard.

In March 2022, Kiteworks was recognized by the Information Security Registered Assessors Program (IRAP) after being evaluated for up to the Protected data classification level.

In August 2022, Kiteworks introduced the Kiteworks Private Data Network, a zero-trust protection and compliance platform for unstructured data communications.

In April 2023, Kiteworks announced that it had achieved Cyber Essentials and Cyber Essentials Plus accreditation, the highest standard for IT security in the United Kingdom. Also, in the same month, it announced that the Kiteworks Private Data Network supports the National Institute of Standards and Technology Cybersecurity Framework (NIST CSF), which allows users to better manage content-based risks.

In February 2024, Kiteworks introduced a feature called SafeEDIT, which is a digital rights management (DRM) technology that enables users to edit various file types natively and share files with third parties using video streaming.

In October 2024, Kiteworks released its AI Data Gateway which allows enterprise employees to use AI technologies while protecting sensitive data, such as personally identifiable information (PII) and intellectual property (IP).

In May 2025, Angelina Apolinar of CyberDefense Magazine, praised Kiteworks hardened virtual appliance architecture and digital rights management (DRM) capabilities that enable collaboration without sharing the original source data.

=== 2020–21 security breaches ===
In mid-December 2020, the company's File Transfer Appliance product—now a 20-year-old legacy system—was subject to a zero-day exploit, which was patched on December 23. Three additional vulnerabilities were discovered and patched over the next month. The first vulnerability was a SQL injection, allowing an attacker to use a web shell to run arbitrary commands and extract data. The four vulnerabilities were assigned Common Vulnerabilities and Exposures (CVE) codes 2021-27101 through 2021-27104 on February 16, 2021.

Out of approximately 300 total FTA clients, up to 25 appeared to have suffered significant data theft including Kroger, Shell Oil Company, the University of California system, the Australian Securities and Investments Commission, the Reserve Bank of New Zealand, and Singtel. Data stolen included Social Security numbers and other identification numbers, images of passports, financial information, driver's license data, and emails. According to computer security firm FireEye, the attackers comprised two hacking groups: one with ties to "Clop", a ransomware group, and one connected to financial crime group "FIN11". Many victims received extortion emails containing a .onion link to a website containing data dumps of multiple organizations. Prior to the attacks, Accellion had maintained that the FTA was a legacy product nearing the end of its life, with support ending on April 30, 2021, asking customers to move to their Kiteworks system.

In January 2022, Accellion proposed that it would pay an $8.1 million settlement in relation to these breaches, to settle all legal actions against Accellion only. Legal actions against clients impacted by the data breach are separate legal matters.

== Acquisitions ==
In January 2022, Kiteworks acquired Totemo AG, an email encryption gateway provider based in Zurich, Switzerland. It is integrated into the Kiteworks Private Data Networks and Kiteworks Email Protection Gateway.

In November 2023, it was announced that Kiteworks had acquired German ownCloud and DRACOON which it intends to use as stepping stones into the European market, and Maytech, based in Tunbridge Wells, to increase its UK market presence and secure data transfer capabilities.

In September 2024, Kiteworks acquired 123FormBuilder, a Romania-based company specializing in web-based data collection and form-driven content workflows.

In June 2025, Kiteworks acquired Zivver [nl], a Dutch company offering secure online communication.

The company made its seventh acquisition in under five years, with Japanese data transfer and file-sharing provider Wamnet, in August 2026.
