= OwnCloud =

Free software for cloud computing

ownCloud
- Developers: ownCloud GmbH, Community
- Stable release: 4.0.0 [±]
- Written in: PHP, JavaScript, Go
- Operating system: Server: Linux; Clients: Windows, macOS, Linux, Android, iOS, Web browser interface
- Type: Online storage, data synchronization
- Licence: Server: AGPL-3.0-or-later; Enterprise: Proprietary
- Website: owncloud.com
- Repository: github.com/owncloud

ownCloud is a free and open-source software project for content collaboration, file-sharing, and file-syncing. It's usable in distributed and federated enterprise scenarios.

ownCloud supports extensions including Collabora, OnlyOffice, Microsoft 365 and Microsoft Online Office, as well as synchronization of calendars and contacts. Most of ownCloud is published under AGPL and GPL licenses, except for some enterprise extensions.

As of late 2023, organizations using ownCloud include CERN, the European Science Cloud, the Bavarian school cloud, and the SCIEBO platform.

== History ==
The ownCloud project was launched in 2010 by Frank Karlitschek, who shortly afterward founded the company of the same name together with Markus Rex and Holger Dyroff. In 2016, ownCloud CTO Karlitschek left the company and founded the fork Nextcloud.

At the end of 2023, ownCloud merged with Kiteworks; however, ownCloud claims its code will remain open-source.

== Versions ==
ownCloud is available in two versions: ownCloud 10, which is built on PHP; and Infinite Scale, which is built on Go.

=== Releases of ownCloud 10 ===
10.0	April 27, 2017	File integrity checks, guest accounts, custom groups, multiple link sharing, new app marketplace
10.1	February 7, 2019	Microsoft Office Online Integration, File Locking, Semantic Versioning, OpenCloudMesh 1.0 compliance
10.2	May 16, 2019	Advanced Sharing Permissions, SecureView, Improved Public Links, Storage Encryption with HSMs
10.3	October 15, 2019	New Media Viewer, improved OAuth2 session handling, improved User/group sharing UI
10.4	March 5, 2020	Expiration dates for user and group shares, supports MariaDB up to 10.4, PostgreSQL up to 10, share indicator on webUI
10.5	August 3, 2020	Official support for PHP 7.4, manual file locking in the web interface, improved background process for metadata of federated shares
10.6	December 16, 2020	
10.7	March 26, 2021	Preparations for upcoming workstream integrations, UI improvements, improved encryption efficiency
10.8	July 21, 2021	New ownCloud Web browser frontend, new login UI, better caching for external storages like Windows Network Drives
10.9	December 23, 2021	Initial sync faster, more detailed file locking, version control and public sharing
10.9.1	January 13, 2022	Prevent encrypted files from being corrupted when overwriting them, Marketplace not working after upgrade from 10.8 to 10.9, Fixes for the newly introduced feature to store the author of versions
10.10.0	May 14, 2022	Many bugfixes, improved management of migrations, session handling and storage.
10.11.0	September 20, 2022	Many bugfixes, edit permission for public links on single files, sharing with multiple users at once, inviting new guests to Custom Groups.
10.12.0	March 12, 2023	Dropped support for PHP 7.3, changed workflow for persistent major versions (added checkbox to select versions to keep), added support for login policies, extended trashbin, mounts, shares and checksum functions.
10.12.1	April 18, 2023	Fix Permission Bits when Enforcing Passwords on Public Links, Prevent 507 Insufficient Storage on 32-Bit Systems, Fix quota for 32-Bit Systems, Add RewriteBase to .htaccess, Updated text editor and metrics apps.
10.13.0	August 24, 2023	Kerberos authentication; enforceable 2-Factor-Authentication via Time-based One-Time Passwords (TOTP); iOS (version 12.0.3+) or Desktop client (version 4.0+) now allow to directly open a file in the Office Suite on the ownCloud server; update Symfony 4.4 -> 5.4;
10.13.1	September 06, 2023	Improvements to "Open in Web"; Avoid Loading 3rd-party Resources; Fix: disallow pre-signed url access if the signing key is not initialized; dismiss invalid settings of the redirection endpoint URI as seen in the OAuth2 protocol, according to RFC#7636; updated apps for Graph API, Guests, OAuth2;
10.13.2	October 10, 2023	Several bugfixes (e.g. Delete all files from object store when user is deleted), fixed view on users page for subadmins, updated PHP dependencies (phpseclib, symfony, ...), remove "Fill E-Tags" repair-step (a legacy step that took very long to run during an upgrade of a large system and didn't repair anything anymore), upgraded Microsoft Office Online app to version 1.8.1., Media Viewer now plays also HEIC and HEIF-files.
10.13.3	November 17, 2023	Fix potential issue with the PreviewCleanup job in postgresql. Reverting Pull request 41059 because of performance problems for large installations. Users can only delete their own external storage configurations, and comments in config.apps.sample.php describing the configuration variables related to kerberos and windows_network_drive are now updated and in sync with published online documentation.
10.13.4	December 13, 2023	A Bugfix to Check 2FA on controllers which are accessible publicly and authenticated, a new feature to prompt the admins of licensed instances to run the IoC-Scanner. The prompt appears in the admin menu and after an upgrade on the CLI.
10.14.0	February 26, 2024	Fix issues where log conditions could break uploads, share expiration was wrong in the web UI, and previews were generated from last page instead of first. Release enables Files->Office menu to work with rich documents 4.1.0 and makes several enhancements to lDAP user and group handling related to external storages and deleting attributes. Performance also improved with version metadata handling. Finally, Google Chrome no longer auto-translates filenames.

=== Releases of ownCloud Infinite Scale ===
Version	Date	New Features
Infinite Scale 2.0.0	November 30, 2022	Complete overhaul of the backend, rewritten in Go and Vue.js, in cooperation with CERN. Spaces for file sharing.
Infinite Scale 3.0.0	June 7, 2023	File Firewall, Antivirus (ICAP), Accessibility (WCAP), Tags, Full text Search, Spaces Templates, Custom User Roles
Infinite Scale 4.0.0	August 25, 2023	Cloud Importer, Drag and Drop to breadcrumbs; Tags, Filter and Highlighting in Full text Search; Improved Link sharing; Copy and Paste for Upload from Keyboard
Infinite Scale 5.0.0	March 18, 2024	

== Features ==
ownCloud files are stored in conventional directory structures and can be accessed via WebDAV if necessary. User files are encrypted both at rest and during transit. ownCloud can synchronize with local clients running Windows, macOS and various Linux distributions. ownCloud users can manage calendars (CalDAV), contacts (CardDAV), scheduled tasks and streaming media (Ampache) from within the platform. Online document editing is supported via Collabora Online, OnlyOffice, Microsoft 365 and Microsoft Office Online.

ownCloud permits user and group administration, via OpenID or LDAP. Content can be shared by granular read/write permissions between users or groups. Alternatively, ownCloud users can create public URLs for sharing files. Furthermore, users can interact with the browser-based ODF-format word processor, bookmarking service, URL shortening suite, gallery, RSS feed reader and document viewer tools from within ownCloud. ownCloud can be augmented with "one-click" applications and connection to Dropbox, Google Drive and Amazon S3.

Enterprise customers have access to apps with additional functionality, which are intended for organizations with more than 500 users. An Enterprise subscription includes support services. Commercial features include end-to-end encryption, ransomware and antivirus protection, branding, document classification, and single sign-on via OpenID.

== See also ==
- Comparison of file hosting services
- Comparison of file synchronization software
- Comparison of online backup services
