= Cold data =

Computer data that is rarely accessed

In computer storage, cold data refers to data that is rarely accessed, therefore considered "cold".

Cold data is the opposite of hot data, which is data that is frequently accessed.

== Uses ==
To optimize storage costs, cold data can be stored on lower performing and less expensive storage media. For example, solid state disks may be used for storing hot data, while cold data can be moved to hard drives, optical discs, tapes, or migrated to cloud storage.

== See also ==
- Cache (computing) – Additional storage that enables faster access to main storage
- Hierarchical storage management – Data storage technique
- Sneakernet – Informal term for the transfer of electronic information by physically moving media
