= Hybrid cloud storage =

Data storage infrastructure

Hybrid cloud storage, in data storage, is a term for a storage infrastructure that uses a combination of on-premises storage resources with a public cloud storage provider. The on-premises storage is usually managed by the organization, while the public cloud storage provider is responsible for the management and security of the data stored in the cloud.

Hybrid cloud architecture

Hybrid cloud storage can be used to supplement an organization's internal storage resources, or it can be used as the primary storage infrastructure. In either case, hybrid cloud storage can provide organizations with greater flexibility and scalability than traditional on-premises storage infrastructure.

There are several benefits to using hybrid cloud storage, including the ability to cache frequently used data on-site for quick access, while inactive cold data is stored off-site in the cloud. This can save space, reduce storage costs and improve performance. Additionally, hybrid cloud storage can provide organizations with greater redundancy and fault tolerance, as data is stored in both on-premises and cloud storage infrastructure.

There are a few drawbacks to hybrid cloud storage as well, including the need to manage two separate storage infrastructures, and the potential for increased costs. Additionally, data stored in the cloud is subject to the security and privacy policies of the cloud storage provider. One challenge in transitioning from traditional storage systems to hybrid cloud storage is that the infinite capacity of the cloud, may lead to accumulation of wasted resources and to uncontrolled spending, if usage is not monitored carefully.

== Use cases ==
Use cases for Hybrid cloud storage include:

- Burst for capacity - Hybrid cloud storage provides infinite and elastic storage capacity expansion to local sites.
- Disaster recovery - Hybrid cloud storage can keep a replica of local data in the cloud for business continuity.
- Burst for compute - Hybrid cloud storage can make locally produced accessible in the cloud for processing or analytics.
- Data orchestration - Hybrid cloud storage can create a consolidated view of data in multiple clouds or locations using a single protocol or interface.

== Cloud storage gateways ==
A cloud storage gateway, also known as an edge filer, is a hybrid cloud storage device that connects a local network to one or more cloud storage service, typically an object storage service such as Amazon S3. It provides a cache for frequently accessed data, providing high speed local access to frequently accessed data in the cloud storage service. Cloud storage gateways also provides additional benefits, such as accessing cloud object storage through traditional file serving protocols, as well as continued access to cached data during connectivity outages.

A cloud storage gateway usually consists of a physical or virtual appliance that is deployed on-premises, at the edge of the network. It presents a file system or object storage interface to the local network, which the users can access in the same way they would access any other file system or object storage. The edge filer transparently transfers the data to and from the cloud storage service, providing local access to the data while it is cached on the edge filer.

There are many use cases for a cloud storage gateway, such as providing a high-speed cache for frequently accessed data, providing continued access to data during connectivity outages, and reducing bandwidth costs by reducing the need to communicate over wide area networks.

== Global file systems ==
A global file system is a distributed file system that can be accessed from multiple locations, typically across a wide-area network, and provides concurrent access to a global namespace from all locations. In order for a file system to be considered global, it must allow for files to be created, modified, and deleted from any location. This access is typically provided by a cloud storage gateway at each edge location, which provides access using the NFS or SMB network file sharing protocols.

There are a number of benefits to using a global file system. First, global file systems can improve the availability of data by allowing multiple copies to be stored in different locations, as well as allowing for rapid restoration of lost data from a remote location. This can be helpful in the event of a disaster, such as a power outage or a natural disaster. Second, global file systems can improve performance by allowing data to be cached closer to the users who are accessing it. This can be especially beneficial in cases where data is accessed by users in different parts of the world. Finally, in contrast to traditional Network attached storage, global file systems can improve the ability of users to collaborate across multiple sites, in a manner similar to Enterprise file synchronization and sharing.

While most enterprise network attached storage devices support some forms of cloud extension, a Global File System utilizes a fundamentally different architecture. In a global filesystem, cloud storage – typically object storage – serves as the core storage element, while caching devices are utilized on-premises to provide data access. These devices can be physical but are increasingly available as virtual solutions that can be deployed in a hypervisor. The use of caching devices reduces the amount of required on-premises storage capacity, and the associated capital expense. Global file systems make it easier to manage access to files across dispersed geographic areas. Utilizing the cloud as a central storage location enables users to access the same data regardless of their location.
