= EFS =

EFS may refer to:

== Medicine and science ==
- Embryonal fyn-associated substrate, encoded by the EFS gene
- Enhancer-FACS-seq, a medical assay
- Estonian Physical Society (Estonian: Eesti Füüsika Selts)

== Technology ==
- Canon EF-S lens mount
- Emergency flotation system, installed on helicopters

=== Computing ===
- Amazon Elastic File System, a file storage service
- Electronic Filing System, of the Singapore Judiciary
- Electronic Filing System (USPTO), of United States Patent and Trademark office
- Extent File System, used in the IRIX operating system
- Encrypting File System, the encryption subsystem of the NTFS file system

== Other uses ==
- Emergency Fire Service, now the South Australian Country Fire Service
- Equal Franchise Society, a defunct American women's suffrage advocacy group
- Estrada de Ferro Sorocabana, a Brazilian railway
- Eternal functional subordination, a theological position
- Exchange of futures for swaps
- Expenditure and Food Survey, of the Office for National Statistics in Great Britain
- GE Energy Financial Services, an American energy infrastructure investor
- Swedish Evangelical Mission (Swedish: Evangeliska fosterlandsstiftelsen)
- Ethnological Forgery Series, a series of songs by the krautrock band Can

== See also ==
- EF (disambiguation)
- EFSS (disambiguation)
- ESF (disambiguation)
- SEF (disambiguation)
- SFE (disambiguation)
- FSE (disambiguation)
- FES (disambiguation)
