= EOO =

EOO or Eoo may refer to:

- Extent of occurrence, a concept in Occupancy–abundance relationship
- End of object, a type of operator in the computer data interchange format BSON
- Exchange of Options for Options, a kind of Exchange for Related Positions (EFRP) contrasted to an Exchange of futures for physicals
- Église Orthodoxe Occidentale, a group involved in Western Rite Orthodoxy in the Orthodox Church of France
- "Eoo" (song), a 2025 song by Bad Bunny from the album Debí Tirar Más Fotos
