= ESFS =

ESFS may refer to:

- European System of Financial Supervision
- European Science Fiction Society

== See also ==
- ESF (disambiguation)
