= Seismic risk in Malta =

Seismic risk in Malta is considered to be low with little historic damage noted and no known victims. The archipelago is however in a potentially significant seismic zone and the risk to the population is probably undervalued.

== Tectonics ==
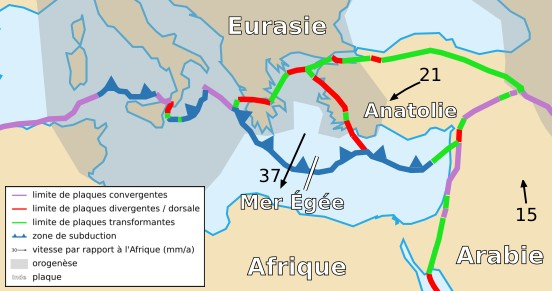
Map of tectonic plates in the Eastern Mediterranean

The Maltese Archipelago rests on an underwater plateau, a relatively stable part of the African Plate. The islands are situated around 200 km to the south of the subduction fault between the African Plate and the Eurasian Plate. The pelagic plate forms a shallow platform separating the Ionian basin from the Western Mediterranean Basin, situated roughly under the Strait of Sicily. The plate is crossed by a rift zone formed of three grabens: the Pantelleria graben, that of Malta, and that of Linosa. These grabens are linked by a system of north–south orientation faults (sometimes west–east) with dextral cavities that are responsible for most of the earthquakes that can affect the archipelago.

The islands themselves are made up of limestone rocks from the Oligocene and Miocene geological epochs, belonging to the Cenozoic era.

== List of major earthquakes ==
Prior to the 20th century and the first seismic recordings in the region, information on Maltese earthquakes was researched in archives. These range mostly from the arrival of the knights of the Order of St John of Jerusalem in 1530 to the British colonisation of Malta. After this period, the localisation of the epicentres of earthquakes in the Sicilian Channel has been relatively limited, mostly due to an inadequate network of seismic stations, particularly before 1980.

=== Summary table of earthquakes since 1500 ===
Year	Date	Localisation of the epicentre	Coordinates	Maximum intensity in Malta	Earthquake intensity	Earthquake magnitude (Mw)
1542	10 December at around 15:15	East of Sicily	37.20°N 14.90°E	7	10	6.6
1562	8 March, morning			5 ?		
1636	1 September			5 ?		
1693	11 January, around 13:30	East of Sicily	37.18°N 15.02°E	7–8	9	7.4
1743	20 February, around 16:30	Ionian Sea	39.87°N 18.78°E	7	9	6.9
1789	19 January, morning	Sicilian Channel ?		5 ?		
1793	26 February, morning	Sicilian Channel ?		5 ?		
1848	11 January, around midday	East of Sicily	37.2°N 15.2°E	5	8–9	5.5
1856	12 October, around 00:45	Crete	37.2°N 15.2°E	7		7.7
1856	8 February, around 23:45	Sicilian Channel ?		5 ?		
1886	15 August, around 02:45	Sicilian Channel ?		5 ?		
1886	27 August, around 22:00	Aegean Sea ?	36.4°N 27.2°E ?	6–7	11	7.3
1911	30 September, around 09:25	Sicilian Channel ?	36.4°N 13.5°E ?	7		
1923	18 September, at 07:30	Sicilian Channel ?	35.5°N 14.5°E ?	6		
1926	26 June at 19:46	Aegean Sea	36.5°N 27.5°E ?	5		7.6
1972	21 March at 23:06	Sicilian Channel	35.8°N 15°E ?	5		4.5
2022	22 November	Sicilian Channel				4.6
2023	22 April at 12.20am		35.026°N 15.219°E			5.3

=== Details of major earthquakes ===
==== Earthquake of 10 December 1542 ====
The Sicilian Chronicle of the 16th century reports that the earthquake of 10 December 1542 was strongly felt in Malta where some houses were knocked down.

==== Earthquake of 11 January 1693 ====
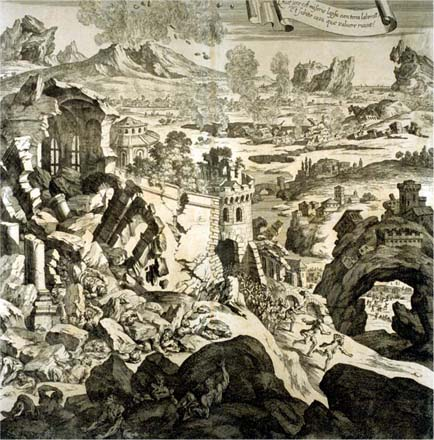
German copper engraving dating from 1696 on the Sicilian earthquake

The earthquake of 11 January 1693 in Val di Noto is the most significant earthquake felt in Malta since the 16th century. In Sicily, it caused the death of around 60,000 individuals. With a magnitude of 7.4, it is considered to be the most powerful earthquakes in Italian history. The earthquake was preceded on 9 January by a precursory earthquake of a magnitude of around 5.9 which was strongly felt but did not cause damage.

In Malta, the earthquake provoked panic among the population, with many Maltese refusing to go back to their homes in the nights that followed, seeking refuge in tents or underground shelters. No injuries or fatalities were reported. The Order delegated its head engineer, Mederico Blondel to assess the damage. At Valletta, no building escaped unharmed by the earthquake, from simple cracks to complete demolition. The other towns of the Grand Harbour were considerably less affected. However, the old city of Mdina suffered more greatly as many of the buildings were older and were poorly maintained. Notably, St. Paul's Cathedral was part destroyed – but the cathedral was already badly damaged before the earthquake, and so a reconstruction had already been planned. The Banca Giuratale in Mdina was equally damaged, and would be rebuilt in 1726 by Charles François de Mondion. At Rabat, the bell tower and the apse of the church of St. Paul came down. The Tal-Virtù Church suffered considerable damage, it was situated at a high altitude which was particularly susceptible to earthquakes.

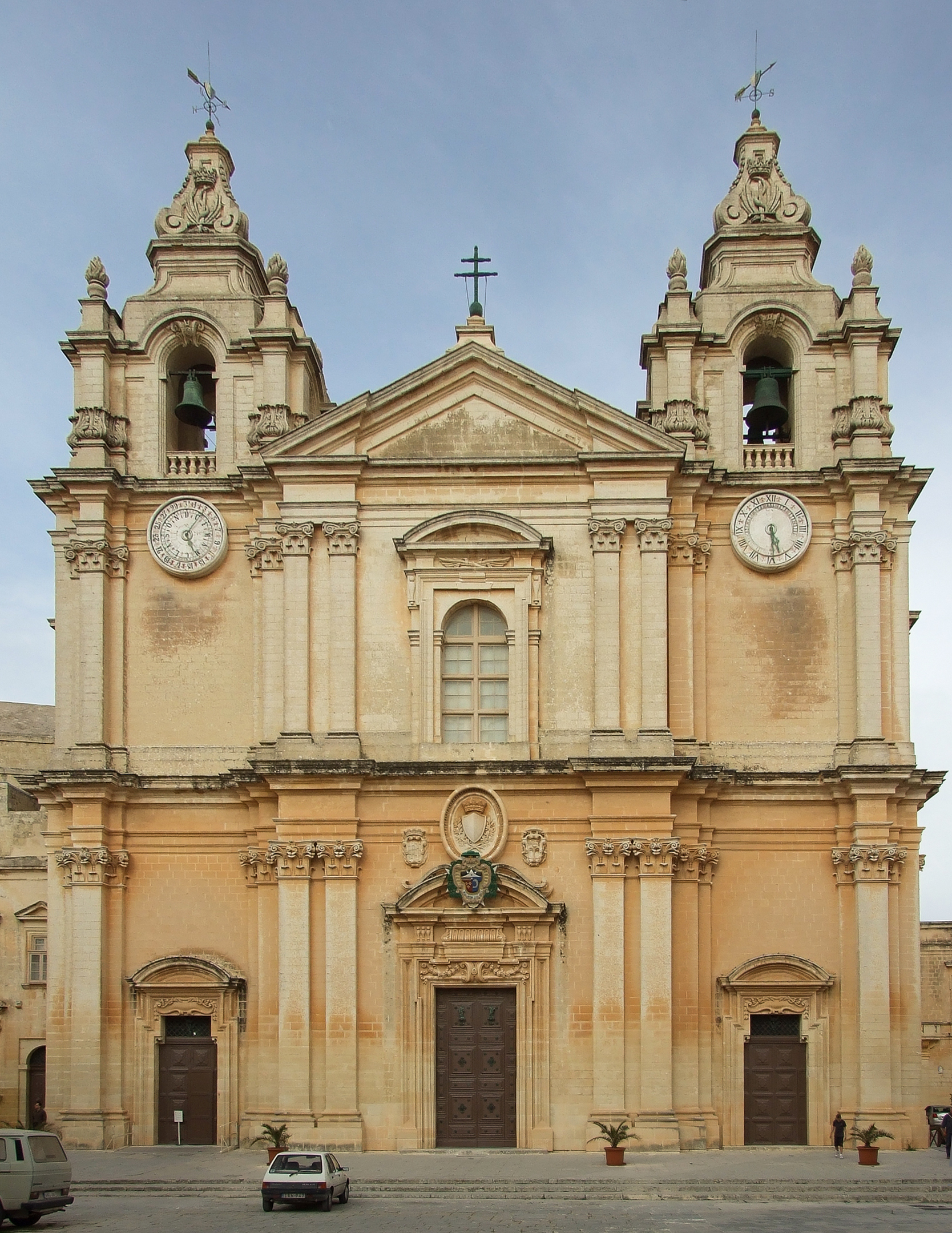
St. Paul's Cathedral, Mdina, rebuilt after the 1693 earthquake, damaged by the 1743 earthquake

At Gozo, the walls of the Cittadella were damaged, but Blondel notes that the damage were more likely caused by years of neglect. The Cathedral of the Assumption, Victoria lost its bell tower.

The considerable material damage in Malta has been attributed to the maximum earthquake intensity of 7–8.

==== Earthquake of 20 February 1743 ====
Local historian Gian Pietro Francesco Agius de Soldanis recounts 20 February 1743 earthquake in his magnum opus Il Gozo Antico-Moderno e Sacro-Profano, a two-volume manuscript dealing with the history of Gozo completed in 1746:

...At 5 pm, a violent earthquake shook the Maltese isles. It lasted for seven minutes. It left great damage on the two isles. At Gozo, the church of Saint George, Saint James and the chapel of Notre-Dame at Qala were greatly damaged. In Malta, the church of St John at Valletta, the cathedral of Mdina and many other churches were also effected. At Wardija, near Qala, people are said to have seen the earth rise and fall with such force that the soil seemed to remain floating in the air, creating a dust cloud that remained for a long time. Many of the hills in Gozo crumbled.

A document in the archives of the cathedral of Mdina described how the coppolino (the little dome) of the cathedral fell into the church, the back end of the choir was destroyed and the bell tower heavily damaged. The cathedral was so cracked in all areas that:

...Even the sound of the bell didn't dare to enter for fear of seeing the building fall.

An account by six architects described three large cracks of around 3 cm in width on each side of the cupola, revealing most of the stones in the cupola and the terrible damage to the walls of the choir.

==== Earthquake of 12 October 1856 ====
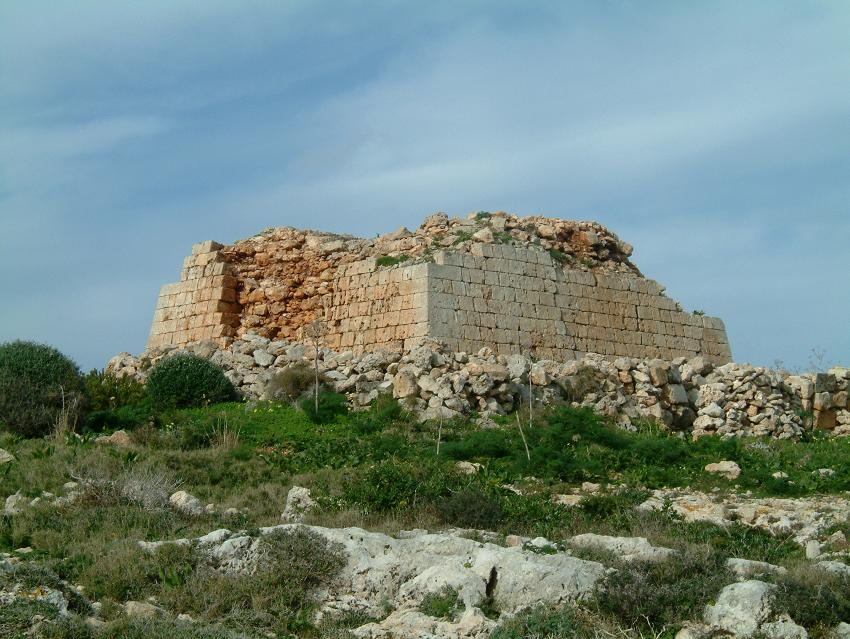
Għajn Ħadid Tower, which collapsed in the 1856 earthquake

The epicentre situated near Crete was very seriously hit by the particularly violent earthquake of 12 October 1856. Certain seismic registers attribute it with a magnitude of 8.2. It claimed numerous victims in Crete. Despite being at a distance of more than 1000 km from the epicentre, the earthquake was violently felt in Malta, as the newspapers of the era testify. People were woken in the middle of the night by a deafening growl and a movement of the earth that lasted between 22 and 60 seconds. Nearly all the houses in Valletta were damaged, as were houses in Gozo, notably on the upper floors. Numerous churches were affected, and in particular the cathedral of Mdina. The belltower of the church of the Carmelites at Mdina was so cracked that it needed to be rebuilt. The chapel on the islet of Filfla was destroyed. The 17th-century Għajn Ħadid Tower collapsed in this earthquake and has remained in ruins ever since.

==== Earthquake of 27 August 1886 ====
This was probably the earthquake on the same day that struck the SW Peloponnese. Once again, the local papers reported a general panic in the population that rushed outside dwellings, awoken by the earthquake on 27 August 1886. Some buildings were affected, including the ceiling of the Palace of Justice in Valletta. For once, the cathedral in Mdina was not greatly affected.

==== Earthquake of 30 September 1911 ====
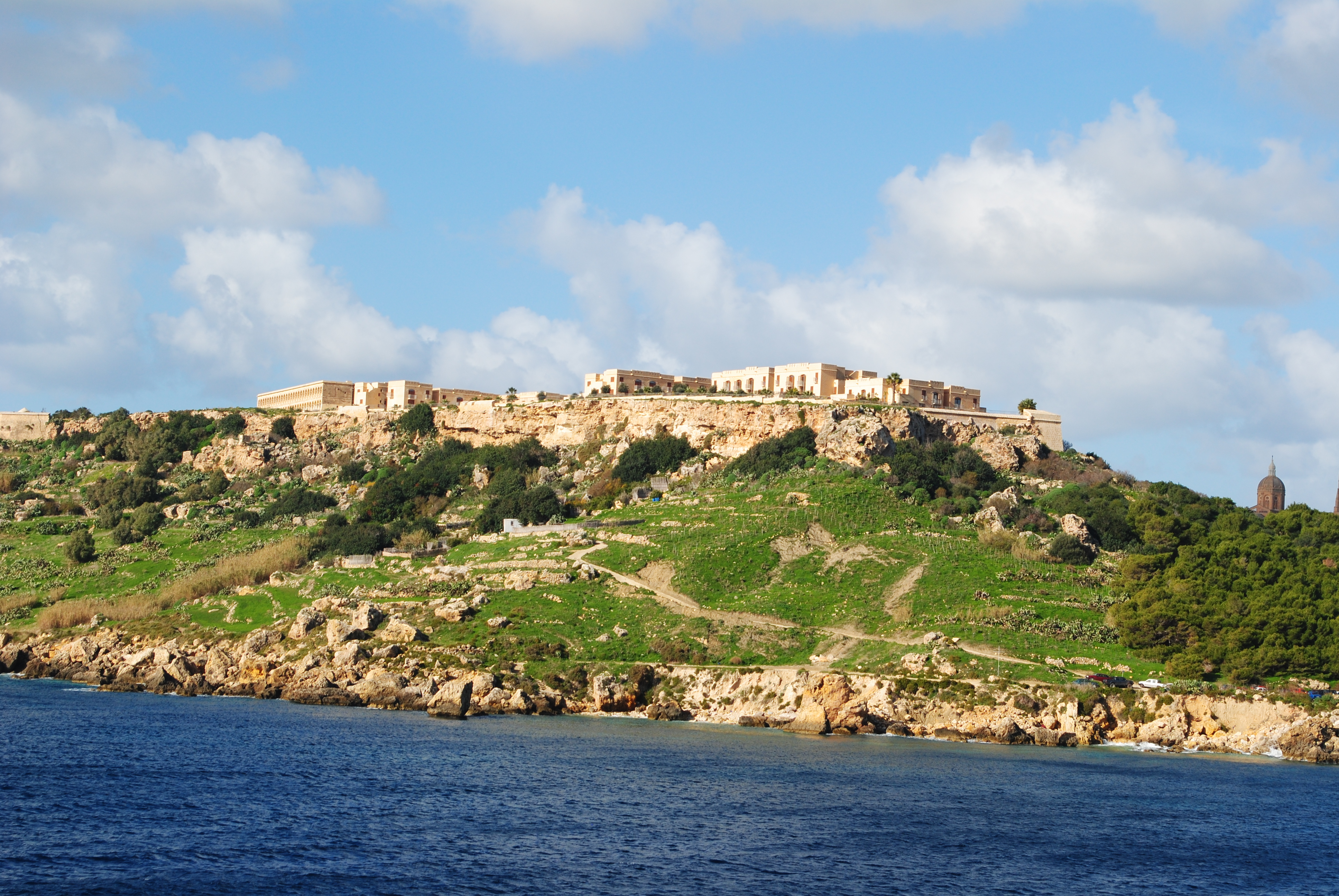
Fort Chambray in Gozo

30 September 1911 earthquake was more distinctly felt in Gozo than in Malta. Newspapers reported the appearance of deep cracks in the domes and the belltowers of many churches, in particular at Nadur, Għarb, and Ir-Rabat, Gozo, where many public buildings were affected. Numerous rural buildings were completely destroyed. Fort Chambray was badly hit. Many landslides were reported on the isle of Gozo. In Malta, damage was limited to a few cracks.

==== Earthquake of 18 September 1923 ====
18 September 1923 earthquake was the first to follow the installation of a Milne seismograph at Valletta. It seems not to have worked and gave no useful information; the seismologic data is therefore not clear. The shock seems to have been most felt around the Grand Harbour. Some damage was reported, such as the falling of the stone crosses on churches or cracks in the domes. The greatest ravages seem to have been those exerted on the church of St Paul in Rabat, Malta. The Tal-Virtù Church was badly damaged and remained unused for more than 70 years.

=== Details of major tsunamis ===
==== Tsunami of 16 January 1693 ====
The tsunami of 16 January 1693 occurred contemporaneously with the strong earthquake. Agius de Soldanis recounts how the sea at Xlendi turned a thousand times before returning with force.

==== Tsunami of 28 December 1908 ====
The tsunami of 28 December 1908 corresponds to the earthquake in the Strait of Messina. At least three large waves caused significant damage and took a number of victims in the east of Sicily. The waves of this tsunami hit the shores of Malta an hour later, causing flooding at Msida, where part of the old town was damaged. At Marsaxlokk a foaming wave crossed the main road hitting the church of St. Peter. At Sliema, the sea came and went with force. The sea level was registered as abnormally high in the Grand Harbour. Many fishing boats were damaged or destroyed, but no deaths were reported.

== Evaluation of seismic risk ==
Seismic risk was evaluated at an event of intensity 8 happening every 1000 years and an event at intensity 6 happening every 92 years. Historically, since 1530, an earthquake of 7–8 intensity has been reported, as well as at least four events of intensity 7.

The risk of a tsunami wave between 4 m and 7 m high is estimated as a possibility every 600 to 1500 years. The occurrence of an event comparable to that of 1603, could have grave social and economic consequences as areas near the sea are largely built up, in particular for tourist activity in the region of Sliema.

== Integration of risk in building standards ==
Despite a proposed bill, no seismic building standards have been imposed as the rate of construction accelerates and numerous buildings are completed. The risk is increased further by building in unreinforced masonry, incorporating heavy floors and concrete roofs with often large cellars used as garages. This type of construction is particularly sensitive to earthquakes.
