= FSE =

FSE may refer to:

== Organizations ==
- Federation of European Scouting (disambiguation) (French: Fédération du Scoutisme Européen)
- Ferrovie del Sud Est, an Italian railway company
- Football Supporters Europe, a football fan network
- Fung Seng Enterprises, a Hong Kong conglomerate
- Franciscan Sisters of the Eucharist, a Roman Catholic religious congregation

== Computing ==
- Fast Software Encryption, cryptography conference
- Finite-state entropy, entropy coding scheme

== Finance ==
- Frankfurt Stock Exchange, Germany's largest stock exchange
- Fukuoka Stock Exchange, a stock exchange in Japan

== Human and veterinary medicine ==
- Feline spongiform encephalopathy
- Fetal scalp electrode

== Science and technology ==
- Fast Spin Echo, a type of magnetic resonance imaging sequence
- Free surface effect, liquids in slack tanks

== Other ==
- Finnish Sign Language (fse), the ISO languagecode for the Finnish sign language
- Fremont Street Experience, a pedestrian mall
- Field service engineer
