= SFE =

SFE may refer to:

== Science and technology ==
- Secure function evaluation, in cryptography
- Shannon-Fano-Elias coding, a lossless data compression algorithm
- Society of Fuse Engineers, designers of certain automotive fuses
- Solar flare effect
- SparkFun Electronics, an electronics retailer
- Spec Files Extra, a way to build common packages for OpenSolaris or OpenIndiana
- Stacking-fault energy, in materials science
- Supercritical fluid extraction
- Surface free energy, often referred to as Surface energy

== Other ==
- Sales force effectiveness
- San Fernando Airport (Philippines) IATA code
- Scottish Financial Enterprise, trade body for the financial services sector in Scotland
- Scouts for Equality, advocates for scouts and leaders in the Boy Scouts of America
- Sigma Phi Epsilon, a college fraternity in the United States
- Student Finance England; see Student Loans Company
- Supplier-furnished equipment
- Sydney Futures Exchange, now merged with the Australian Stock Exchange to become the Australian Securities Exchange
- The Encyclopedia of Science Fiction
- Something For Everybody, an album by Sammy Rae & The Friends
