= EFSS =

EFSS may refer to:

- Enterprise file synchronization and sharing (enterprise file sync and share), software to securely share documents
- Edgefield Secondary School, Punggol, Singapore
- M327 Expeditionary Fire Support System (mortar), see List of crew-served weapons of the U.S. Armed Forces
- M1163 Expeditionary Fire Support System (jeep), see List of currently active United States military land vehicles
- LAV Expeditionary Fire Support System (armored car), see List of vehicles of the United States Marine Corps

== See also ==
- EFS (disambiguation)
