= Aerospace manufacturer =

Company involved in making aircraft, rockets, or spacecraft

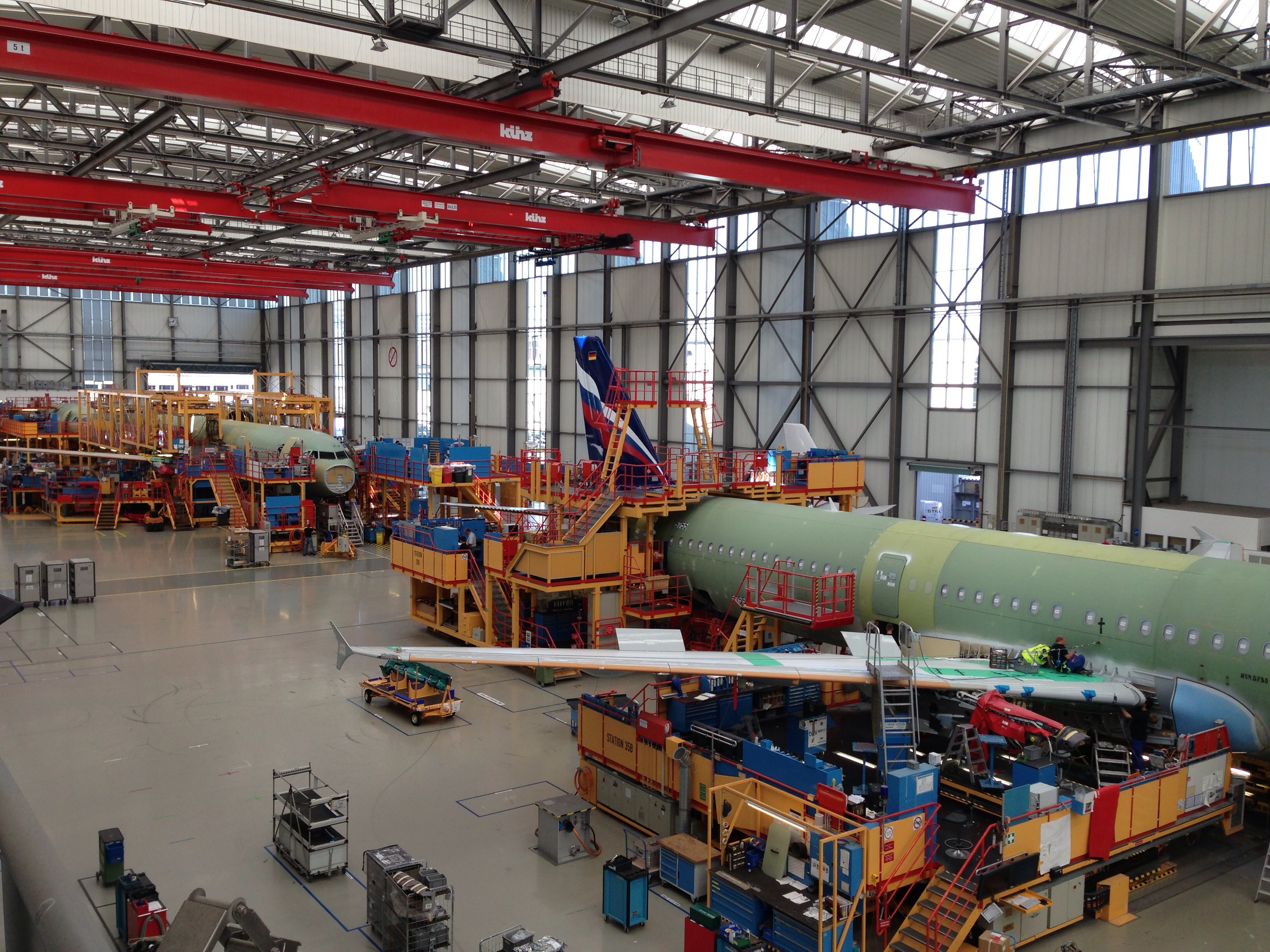
An Airbus A321 on final assembly line 3 in the Airbus plant at Hamburg Finkenwerder Airport

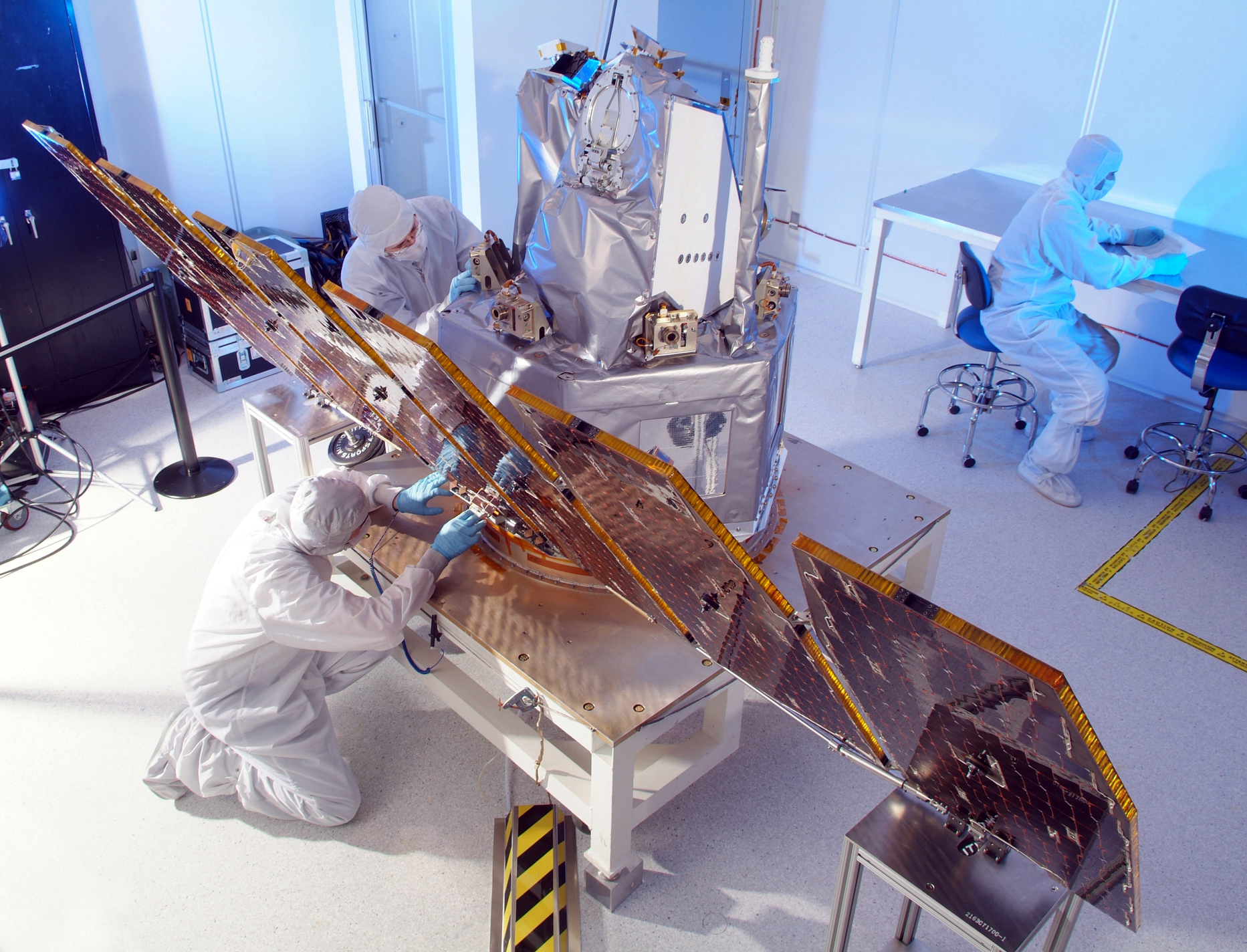
NASA's AIM (Aeronomy of Ice in the Mesosphere) satellite, assembled in clean room

An aerospace manufacturer is a company or individual involved in the various aspects of designing, building, testing, selling, and maintaining aircraft, aircraft parts, missiles, rockets, or spacecraft. Aerospace is a high technology industry.

The aircraft industry is the industry supporting aviation by building aircraft and manufacturing aircraft parts for their maintenance. This includes aircraft and parts used for civil aviation and military aviation. Most production is done pursuant to type certificates and Defense Standards issued by a government body. This term has been largely subsumed by the more encompassing term: "aerospace industry".

== Market ==
In 2015 the aircraft production was worth US$180.3 billion: 61% airliners, 14% business and general aviation, 12% military aircraft, 10% military rotary wing and 3% civil rotary wing; while their MRO was worth $135.1 Bn or $315.4 Bn combined.

The global aerospace industry was worth $838.5 billion in 2017: aircraft & engine OEMs represented 28% ($235 Bn), civil & military MRO & upgrades 27% ($226 Bn), aircraft systems & component manufacturing 26% ($218 Bn), satellites & space 7% ($59 Bn), missiles & UAVs 5% ($42 Bn) and other activity, including flight simulators, defense electronics, public research accounted for 7% ($59 Bn). The Top 10 countries with the largest industrial bases in 2017 were the United States with $408.4 billion (representing 49% of the whole), followed by France with $69 billion (8.2%), then China with $61.2 billion (7.3%), the United Kingdom with $48.8 billion (5.8%), Germany with $46.2 billion (5.5%), Russia with $27.1 billion (3.2%), Canada with $24 billion (2.9%), Japan with $21 billion (2.5%), Spain with $14 billion (1.7%) and India with $11 billion (1.3%). These ten countries represent $731 billion or 87.2% of the whole industry.

In 2018, the new commercial aircraft value is projected for $270.4 billion while business aircraft will amount for $18 billion and civil helicopters for $4 billion.

== Largest aerospace companies ==
By Revenue ($ billion)
Company	2022	2019	2018	2017	2016	2015	2014	Country
RTX Corporation	67.1							United States (in July 2023, Raytheon Technologies Corporation changed its name to RTX Corporation)
Airbus (Note: In 2019, Airbus displaced Boeing as the largest aerospace company by revenue due to the Boeing 737 MAX groundings, with $2 billion operating losses down from $12 billion profits the previous year.)	66.6	76.6	101.0	93.4	94.6	96.1	90.8	France Germany Spain
Lockheed Martin	66.0	59.8	53.8	51.0	47.2	40.5	45.6	United States
Boeing	61.8	78.9	75.1	72.3	70.8	68.8	80.6	United States
Northrop Grumman	36.6	33.8	30.1	25.8	24.5	23.5	24.0	United States
Rostec	30.0							Russia
BAE Systems	27.0	22.8	12.8	13.4	13.4	13.9	13.7	United Kingdom
GE Aerospace	26.1		30.6	27.4	26.3	24.7	24.0	United States
Safran	20.0		25.2	17.9	16.8	16.6	18.3	France
Rolls-Royce Holdings	17.2		15.0	12.7	12.0	13.2	14.7	United Kingdom
L3Harris	17.1							United States
Leonardo (Finmeccanica)	15.5		14.4	12.5	12.8	13.9	17.2	Italy
United Technologies (Note: United Technologies merged with the Raytheon Company in April 2020 to form Raytheon Technologies (RTX Corporation).)		46.9	36.0	30.9	29.0	33.1	36.2	United States
Raytheon Company			27.1	25.3	24.1	23.2	22.8	United States

By Operating profit ($ billion)
Company	2022	2019	2018	2017	2016	2015	2014	Country
Lockheed Martin	8.35	8.55	7.33	5.90	5.55	4.71	5.59	United States
Airbus	5.60	1.5	5.95	3.70	2.40	4.34	4.50	France Germany Spain
RTX Corporation	5.41							United States (in July 2023, Raytheon Technologies Corporation changed its name to RTX Corporation)
GE Aerospace	4.78		6.47	6.64	6.12	5.51	5.00	United States
Northrop Grumman	3.60	3.97	3.78	3.30	3.19	3.08	3.20	United States
Rostec	3.18							Russia
Safran	2.06		3.43	2.58	2.54	1.71	2.74	France
L3Harris	1.27							United States
Leonardo (Finmeccanica)	0.87		0.59	0.90	1.05	0.94	0.72	Italy
Boeing	-3.55	-1.98	12.00	10.30	4.90	5.18	7.47	United States
BAE Systems		-	-	-	-	-	-	United Kingdom
Rolls-Royce Holdings			0.44	1.11	0.98	1.77	2.15	United Kingdom
United Technologies		5.77	3.57	3.83	3.84	3.00	4.57	United States
Raytheon Company			4.54	3.32	3.24	3.01	3.18	United States

== Geography ==
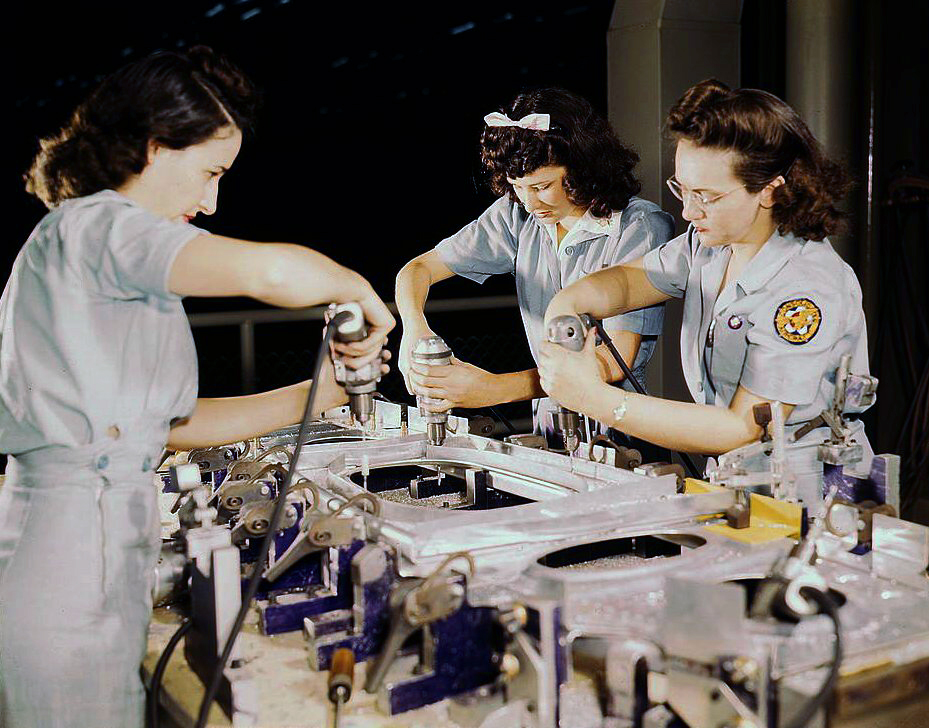
A wing bulkhead being drilled at Consolidated Aircraft Corporation in Texas, October 1942

In September 2018, PwC ranked aerospace manufacturing attractiveness: the most attractive country was the United States, with $240 billion in sales in 2017, due to the size of its industry (#1), an educated workforce (#1), low geopolitical risk (#4, #1 is Japan), strong transportation infrastructure (#5, #1 is Hong Kong), a healthy economy (#10, #1 is China), but high costs (#7, #1 is Denmark) and average tax policy (#36, #1 is Qatar). Following were Canada, Singapore, Switzerland and the United Kingdom.

Within the US, the most attractive was Washington state, due to the best Industry (#1), leading Infrastructure (#4, New Jersey is #1) and Economy (#4, Texas is #1), good labor (#9, Massachusetts is #1), average tax policy (#17, Alaska is #1) but is costly (#33, Montana is #1). Washington is tied to Boeing Commercial Airplanes, earning $10.3 billion, is home to 1,400 aerospace-related businesses, and has the highest aerospace jobs concentration. Following are Texas, Georgia, Arizona and Colorado.

In the US, the Department of Defense and NASA are the two biggest consumers of aerospace technology and products. The Bureau of Labor Statistics of the United States reported that the aerospace industry employed 444,000 wage and salary jobs in 2004, many of which were in Washington and California; this marked a steep decline from the peak years during the Reagan Administration when total employment exceeded 1,000,000 aerospace industry workers.

During that period of recovery a special program to restore U.S. competitiveness across all U.S. industries, Project Socrates, contributed to employment growth as the U.S. aerospace industry captured 72 percent of the world aerospace market. By 1999 the U.S. share of the world market fell to 52 percent.

In the European Union, aerospace companies such as Airbus, Safran, BAE Systems, Thales, Dassault, Saab AB, Terma A/S, Patria Plc and Leonardo are participants in the global aerospace industry and research effort.

In Russia, large aerospace companies like Oboronprom and the United Aircraft Corporation (encompassing Mikoyan, Sukhoi, Ilyushin, Tupolev, Yakovlev, and Irkut, which includes Beriev) are among the major global players in this industry.

=== Cities ===
Important locations of the civil aerospace industry worldwide include Seattle, Wichita, Kansas, Dayton, Ohio and St. Louis in the United States (Boeing), Montreal and Toronto in Canada (Bombardier, Pratt & Whitney Canada), Toulouse and Bordeaux in France (Airbus, Dassault, ATR), Seville in Spain and Hamburg in Germany (Airbus), the North-West of England and Bristol in Britain (Airbus and AgustaWestland), Komsomolsk-on-Amur and Irkutsk in Russia (Sukhoi, Beriev), Kyiv and Kharkiv in Ukraine (Antonov), Nagoya in Japan (Mitsubishi Heavy Industries Aerospace and Kawasaki Heavy Industries Aerospace), as well as São José dos Campos in Brazil where Embraer is based.

== Consolidation ==
Several consolidations took place in the aerospace and defense industries over the last few decades.

Airbus prominently illustrated the European airliner manufacturing consolidation in the late 1960s.

Between 1988 and 2010, more than 5,452 mergers and acquisitions with a total known-value of US$579 billion were announced worldwide.

In 1993, then United States Secretary of Defense Les Aspin and his deputy William J. Perry held the "Last Supper" at the Pentagon with contractors executives who were told that there were twice as many military suppliers as he wanted to see: $55 billion in military–industry mergers took place from 1992 to 1997, leaving mainly Boeing, Lockheed Martin, Northrop Grumman and Raytheon. Boeing bought McDonnell Douglas for US$13.3 billion in 1996. Raytheon acquired Hughes Aircraft Company for $9.5 billion in 1997.

BAE Systems is the successor company to numerous British aircraft manufacturers which merged throughout the second half of the 20th century. Many of these mergers followed the 1957 Defence White Paper. Marconi Electronic Systems, a subsidiary of the General Electric Company, was acquired by British Aerospace for US$12.3 billion in 1999 merger, to form BAE Systems.

In 2002, when Fairchild Dornier was bankrupt, Airbus, Boeing or Bombardier declined to take the 728JET/928JET large regional jet program as mainline and regional aircraft manufacturers were split and Airbus was digesting its ill-fated Fokker acquisition a decade earlier.

On September 4, 2017, United Technologies acquired Rockwell Collins in cash and stock for $23 billion, $30 billion including Rockwell Collins' net debt, for $500+ million of synergies expected by year four.

Major aerospace and defence deals 2012-2018
Target	Buyer	Closed	U.S. Bn	Ref.
Precision Castparts	Berkshire Hathaway	January 2016	37.2	
Rockwell Collins	United Technologies	November 2018	30.0	
Goodrich	United Technologies	July 2012	18.3	
Orbital ATK	Northrop Grumman	June 2018	9.2	
Sikorsky	Lockheed Martin	November 2015	9.0	
B/E Aerospace	Rockwell Collins	April 2017	8.6	
Alliant Techsystems' A&D Group	Orbital ATK	February 2015	5.0	
Exelis Inc.	Harris Corporation	May 2015	4.75	
Avio S.p.A. Aviation Business	General Electric	August 2013	4.3	
Titanium Metals Corp	Precision Castparts	December 2012	3.0	
Firth Rixson	Alcoa	July 2015	2.85	

The Oct. 16, 2017 announcement of the CSeries partnership between Airbus and Bombardier Aerospace could trigger a daisy chain of reactions towards a new order. Airbus gets a new, efficient model at the lower end of the narrowbody market which provides the bulk of airliner profits and can abandon the slow selling A319 while Bombardier benefits from the growth in this expanded market even if it holds a smaller residual stake. Boeing could forge a similar alliance with either Embraer with its E-jet E2 or Mitsubishi Heavy Industries and its MRJ.

On 21 December, Boeing and Embraer confirmed they were discussing a potential merger, with any transaction subject to approval from Brazilian government regulators as well as the companies' boards and shareholders. The weight of Airbus and Boeing could help E2 and CSeries sales but the 100-150 seats market seems slow. As the CSeries, renamed A220, and E-jet E2 are more capable than their predecessors, they moved closer to the lower end of the narrowbodies. In 2018, the four Western airframers combined into two within nine months as Boeing acquired 80% of Embraer's airliners for $3.8 billion on July 5.

On April 3, 2020, Raytheon and United Technologies Corporation (except Otis Worldwide, leaving Rockwell Collins and engine maker Pratt and Whitney) merged to form Raytheon Technologies Corporation, with combined sales of $79 billion in 2019.

The most prominent unions between 1995 and 2020 include those of Boeing and McDonnell Douglas; the French, German and Spanish parts of EADS; and United Technologies with Rockwell Collins then Raytheon, but many mergers projects did not go through: Textron-Bombardier, EADS-BAE Systems, Hawker Beechcraft-Superior Aviation, GE-Honeywell, BAE Systems-Boeing (or Lockheed Martin), Dassault-Aerospatiale, Safran-Thales, BAE Systems-Rolls-Royce or Lockheed Martin–Northrop Grumman.

== Suppliers ==
The largest aerospace suppliers are United Technologies with $28.2 billion of revenue, followed by GE Aerospace with $24.7 billion, Safran with $22.5 billion, Rolls-Royce Holdings with $16.9 billion, Honeywell Aerospace with $15.2 billion and Rockwell Collins including B/E Aerospace with $8.1 billion. Electric aircraft development could generate large changes for the aerospace suppliers.

On 26 November 2018, United Technologies announced the completion of its Rockwell Collins acquisition, renaming systems supplier UTC Aerospace Systems as Collins Aerospace, for $23 billion of sales in 2017 and 70,000 employees, and $39.0 billion of sales in 2017 combined with engine manufacturer Pratt & Whitney.

== Supply chain ==
Before the 1980s/1990s, aircraft and aeroengine manufacturers were vertically integrated. Then Douglas aircraft outsourced large aerostructures and the Bombardier Global Express pioneered the "Tier 1" supply chain model inspired by automotive industry, with 10-12 risk-sharing limited partners funding around half of the development costs. The Embraer E-Jet followed in the late 1990s with fewer than 40 primary suppliers. Tier 1 suppliers were led by Honeywell, Safran, Goodrich Corporation and Hamilton Sundstrand.

In the 2000s, Rolls-Royce reduced its supplier count after bringing in automotive supply chain executives. On the Airbus A380, less than 100 major suppliers outsource 60% of its value, even 80% on the A350. Boeing embraced an aggressive Tier 1 model for the 787 but with its difficulties began to question why it was earning lower margins than its suppliers while it seemed to take all the risk, ensuing its 2011 Partnering for Success initiative, as Airbus initiated its own Scope+ initiative for the A320. Tier 1 consolidation also affects engine manufacturers : GE Aerospace acquired Avio in 2013 and Rolls-Royce took control of ITP Aero.

== See also ==
- Aerospace
- Aerospace companies of the United States
- Aerospace industry in the United Kingdom
- Military–industrial complex
- Aircraft industry
  - Aircraft industry of Russia
  - Aircraft parts industry
  - List of aircraft manufacturers
- Space industry
  - Space industry of India
  - Space industry of Russia
  - Commercial Spaceflight Federation (US)
  - List of spacecraft manufacturers
- Supplier-furnished equipment
