= Larvikite =

Variety of monzonite, an igneous rock

- Igneous rock
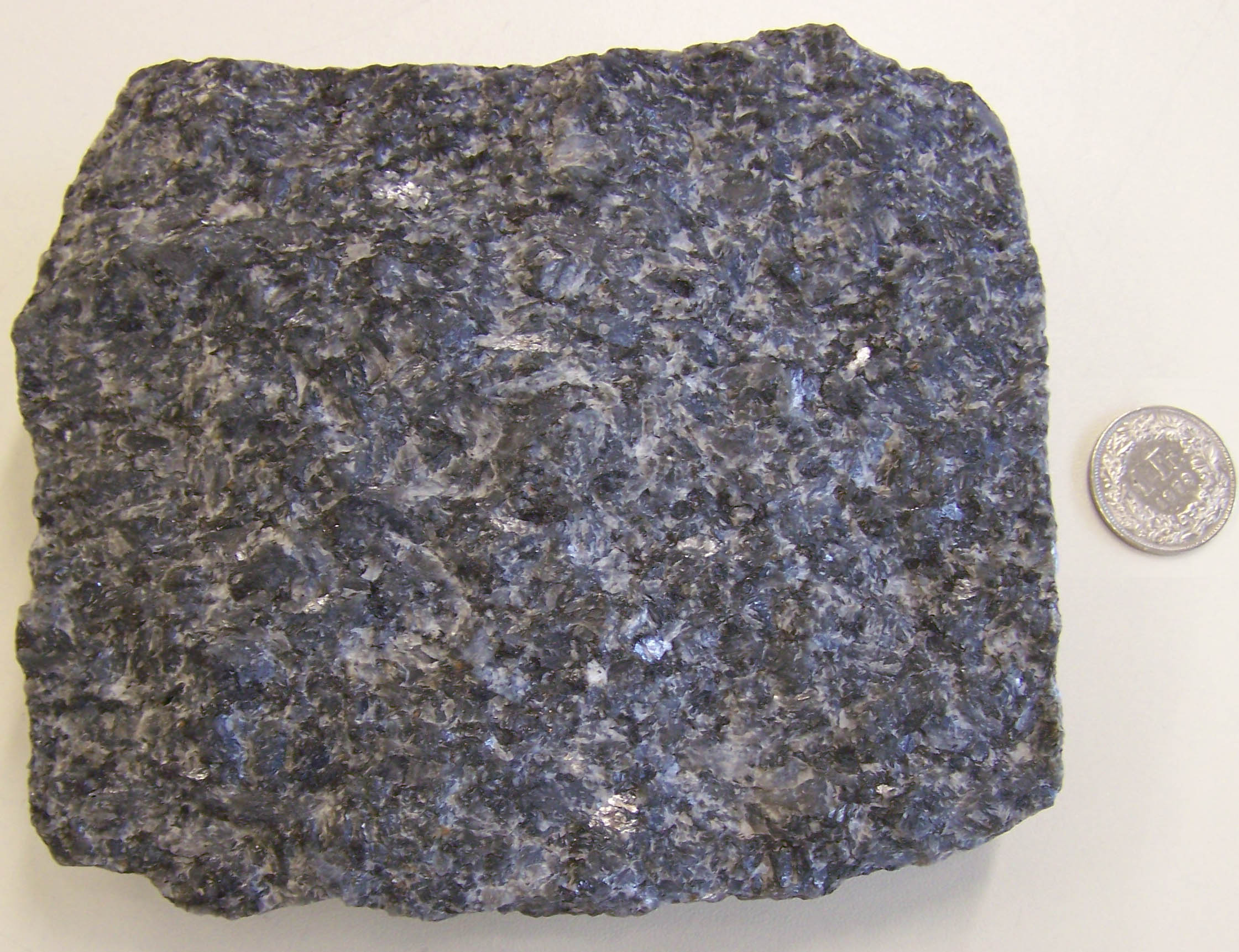
- Larvikite from Larvik, Norway

Composition
- Plagioclase, alkali feldspar, amphibole

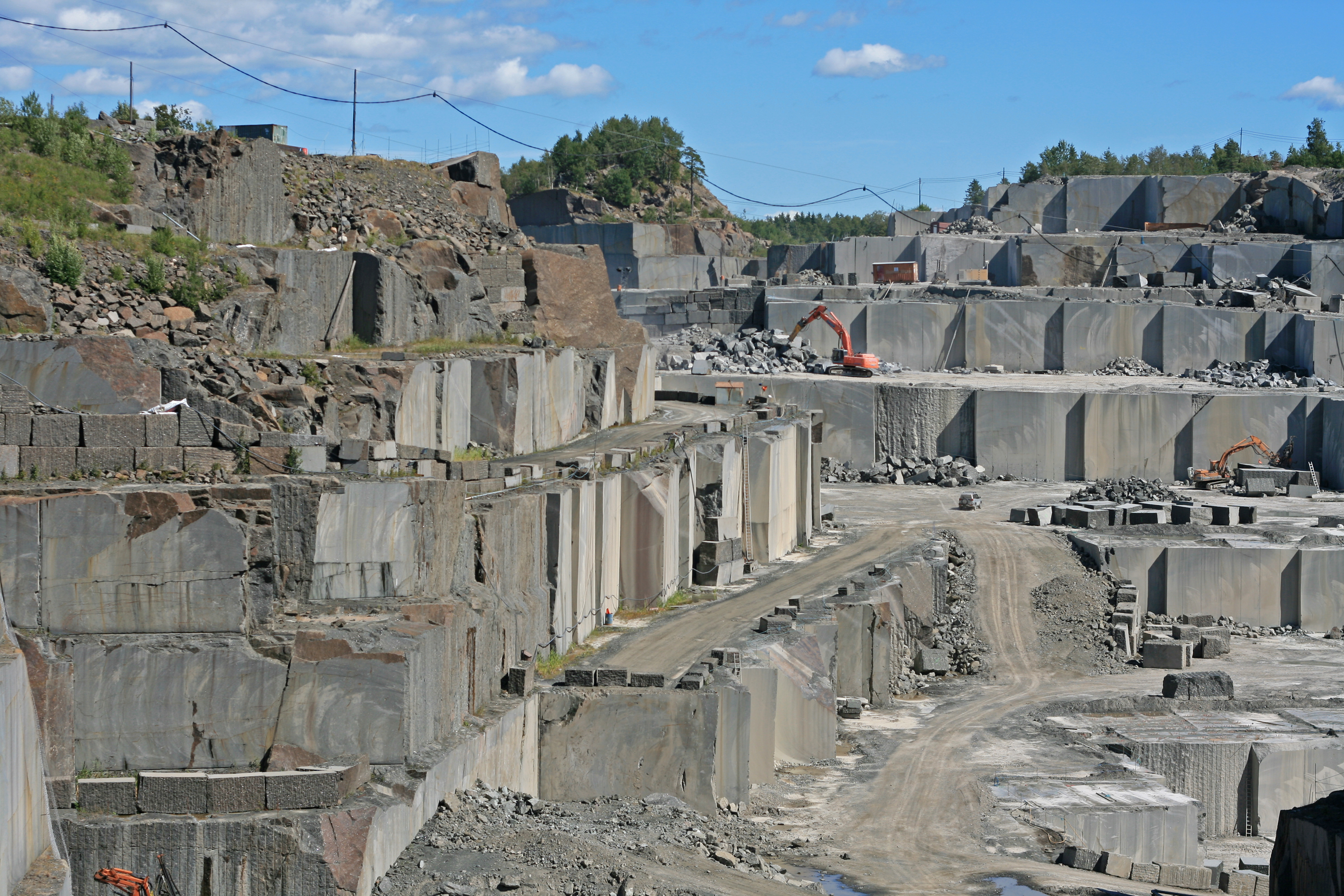
A larvikite quarry in Larvik, Norway, 2008

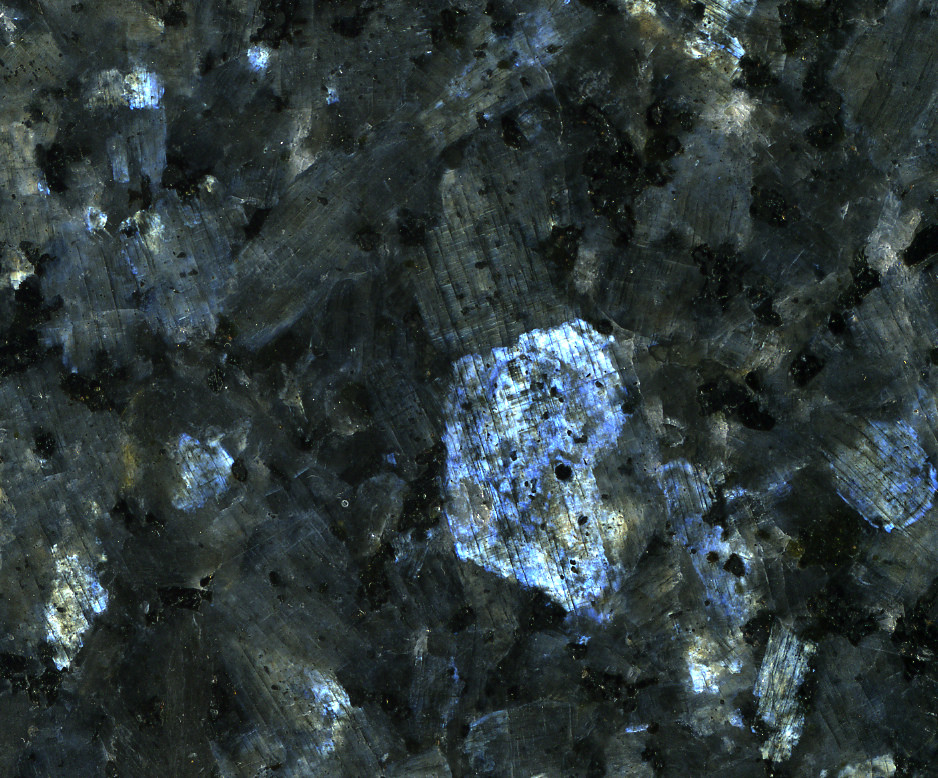
Polished larvikite (marketed as "Blue Pearl Granite"), showing labradorescence, is a popular decorative stone.

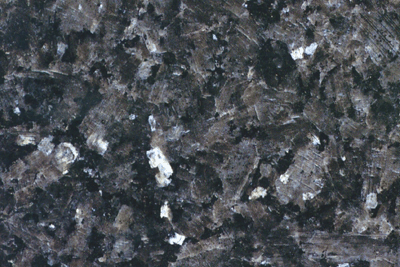
Light larvikite with a polished surface

Larvikite is an igneous rock, specifically a variety of monzonite, notable for the presence of thumbnail-sized crystals of feldspar. These feldspars are known as ternary because they contain significant components of all three endmember feldspars.

The feldspar has partly unmixed on the micro-scale to form a perthite, and the presence of the alternating alkali feldspar and plagioclase layers give its characteristic silver-blue schiller effect (called labradorescence) on polished surfaces. Olivine can be present along with apatite, and locally quartz. Larvikite is usually rich in titanium, with titanaugite and/or titanomagnetite present.

Larvikite occurs in the Larvik Batholith (also called the Larvik Plutonic Complex), a suite of ten igneous plutons emplaced in the Oslo Rift (Oslo Graben) surrounded by ~1.1 billion year old Sveconorwegian gneisses. The Larvik Batholith is of Permian age, about 292–298 million years old. Larvikite is also found in the Killala Lake Alkalic Rock Complex near Thunder Bay in Ontario, Canada.

The name originates from the town of Larvik in Norway, where this type of igneous rock is found. Many quarries exploit larvikite in the vicinity of Larvik.

== Formation ==
Intrusions of larvikite in Norway form part of the suite of igneous rocks that were emplaced during the Permian period, associated with the formation of the Oslo Rift. The crystallisation of a ternary feldspar indicates that this rock began to crystallise under lower crustal conditions.

== Uses ==
Larvikite is prized for its high polish and the labradorescence of its feldspar crystals, and is used as dimension stone, often cladding the facades of commercial buildings and corporate headquarters. It is known informally as Blue Pearl Granite, although this is not an accurate description. Larvikite has been designated by the International Union of Geological Sciences as a Global Heritage Stone Resource.
