= ESF =

ESF may refer to:

== Education ==
- Écoles Sans Frontières, a French educational charity
- Education Without Borders (Spanish organization) (Spanish: Educación Sin Fronteras), a Spanish educational charity
- Emmanuel Schools Foundation, a British educational charity
- English Schools Foundation, an organization of twenty two international schools in Hong Kong
- Esperantic Studies Foundation, a Canadian Esperanto organization
- European School, Frankfurt am Main, in Germany
- Evans Scholars Foundation, an American scholarship program
- State University of New York College of Environmental Science and Forestry, in Syracuse, New York, United States

== Science and technology ==
- European Science Foundation, a research organization
- European Studbook Foundation, studbooks of reptiles and amphibians in captivity
- Electro sinter forging
- Extended superframe
- Exatron Stringy Floppy, an 8-bit computer peripheral
- Explosion Suppressant Foam, used to protect from fire in aircraft wings

== Other uses ==
- East Sea Fleet, of the Chinese People's Liberation Army Navy
- Empowering Spirits Foundation, an American LGBT rights organization
- English Stone Forum, a British conservation organization
- Entertainment Sports and Fun Camps (ESF), network of day camps
- Esler Airfield, in Louisiana, United States
- Estafeta Carga Aérea, a Mexican airline
- European Services Forum, a lobby group
- European Social Forum, a conference series
- European Social Fund of the European Union, currently European Social Fund Plus
- European Softball Federation
- European Ski Federation
- European Squash Federation
- Exchange Stabilization Fund, of the United States Treasury Department
- Expeditionary strike group in the United States Navy
