= Global Heritage Stone Resource =

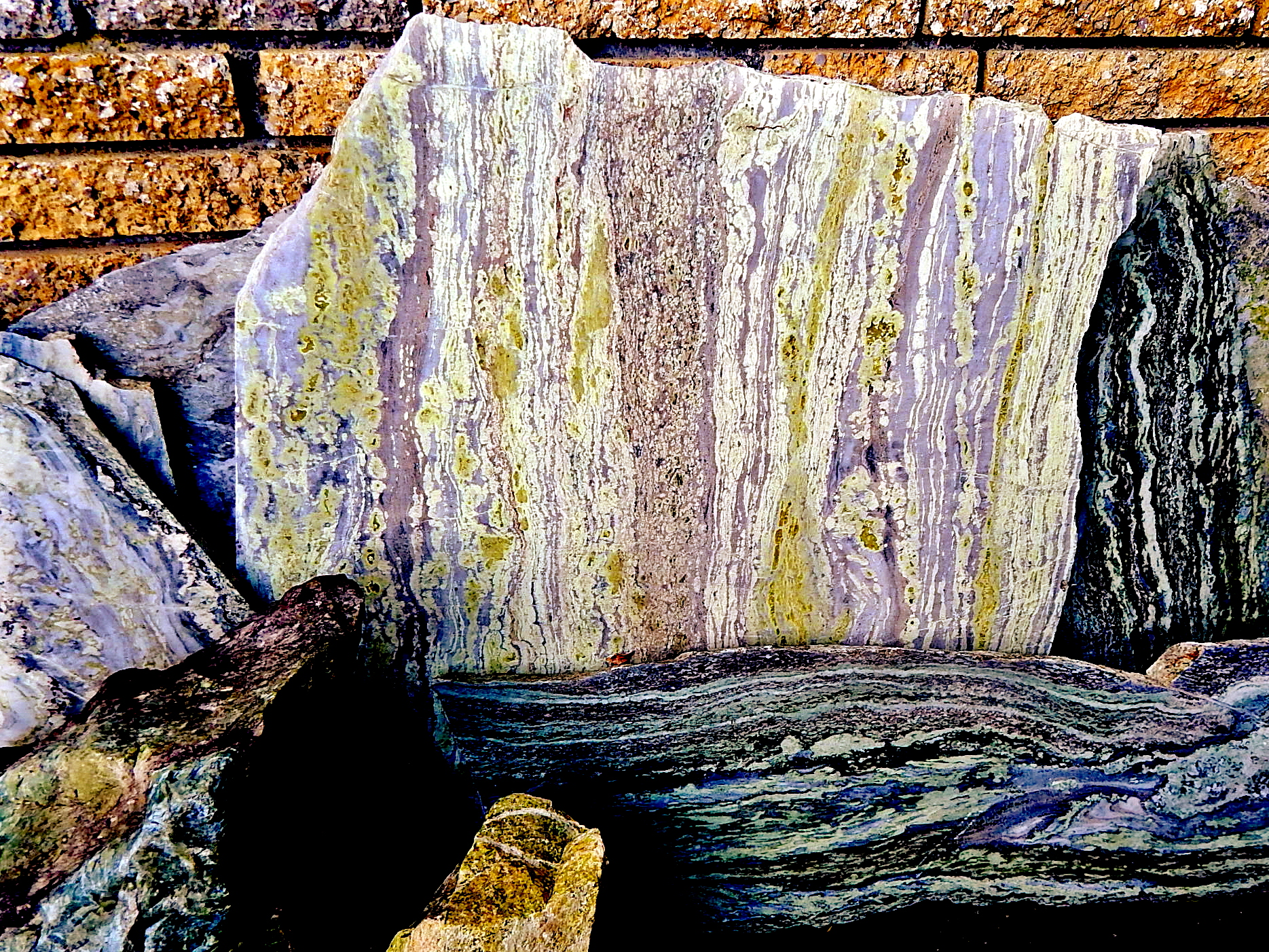
County Galway - Moycullen - Connemara Marble - Connemara Marble Slabs - geograph.org.uk - 4005265

The Global Heritage Stone Resource (GHSR) designation seeks international recognition of natural stone resources that have achieved widespread utilisation in human culture. Details of the "Global Heritage Stone Resource" proposal were first provided publicly at the 33rd International Geological Congress in Oslo in August 2008. However, this initiative was suggested in 2007 to enrich an international acknowledgment of famous dimension stones. At the same conference it was agreed to advance the GHSR proposal under the auspices of "Commission C-10 Building Stones and Ornamental Rocks" of the International Association for Engineering Geology and the Environment (IAEG). Since the Oslo conference the designation has also gained support from the International Union of Geological Sciences (IUGS).

As of February 2019, the following had been designated as 'GHSR's:

- Portland stone
- Larvikite
- Petit Granit
- Hallandia gneiss
- Podpeč limestone
- Carrara marble
- Estremoz marble
- Lede stone
- Welsh slate
- Piedra Mar del Plata
- Kolmarden serpentine marble
- Lioz Stone
- Jacobsville Sandstone
- Maltese Lower Globigerina limestone

In July 2019, the following were designated:

- Lioz limestone
- Alpedrete granite
- Bath stone
- Macael marble
- Makrana marble
- Pietra serena
- Rosa Beta granite
- Tennessee Marble

In 2023, the following were designated:

- Tezoantla tuff
- Tyndall stone

== See also ==
English Stone Forum
