= Geology of Malta =

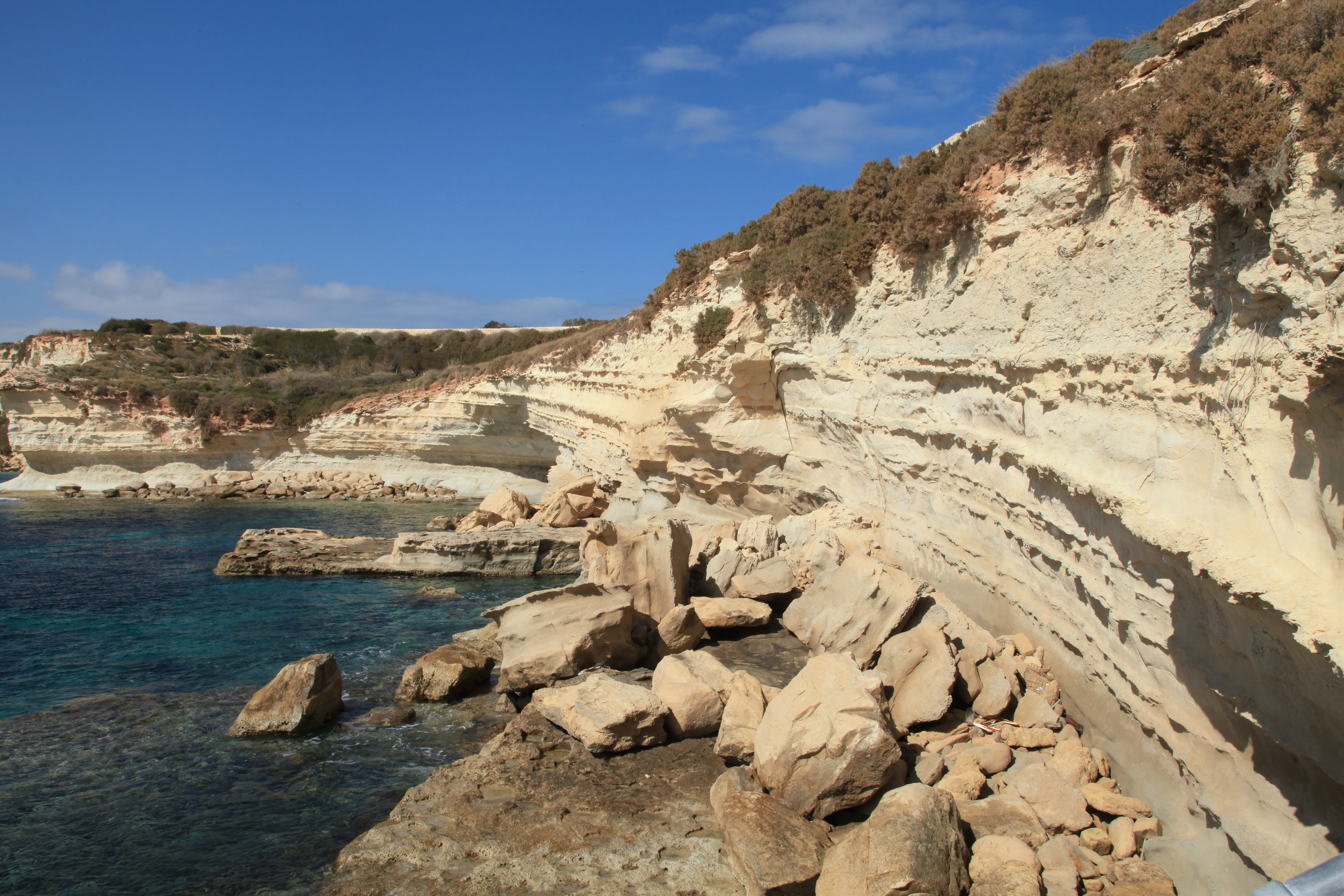
Cliffs of Upper Globogerina Limestone Formation at Il-Ħofra l-Kbira near Marsaxlokk

The Geology of Malta consists of a sequence of sedimentary rocks of late Oligocene to late Miocene age cut through by a set of extensional faults of Pliocene age.

== Tectonics ==
The Maltese archipelago is situated on the mainly shallow water continental platform between Sicily and North Africa that lies beneath the Sicily Channel, separating the Ionian Basin from the western Mediterranean Basin. The islands lie around 200 km to the south of the subduction boundary between the African Plate and the Eurasian Plate. The platform is crossed by a rift zone formed of three grabens: the Pantelleria graben, that of Malta, and that of Linosa. The faults bounding these grabens are associated with most of the earthquakes that affect the archipelago, although some earthquakes with epicentres in Sicily may have damaging effects, such as the 1693 Sicily earthquake.

== Formation of the islands ==
The Maltese archipelago, situated between Sicily and Tunisia, was created through the uplift of sedimentary rocks. This uplift dates from the late Miocene to the Pliocene. Malta forms the crest of a tilted block on the edge of the Malta Graben. The isle of Lampedusa is made up of an identical structure on the southwest side of this rift.

== Nature of the sub-soil ==
The rocks are exclusively sedimentary. There is a lot of limestone, which has contributed to the construction of the ancient buildings of the island. These rocks come from marine deposits (essentially from lagoons) dating from between 25 and 5 million years ago.

== The geological strata ==
The stratigraphy of the Maltese islands consists of five geological formations, ranging in age from late Oligocene to late Miocene.

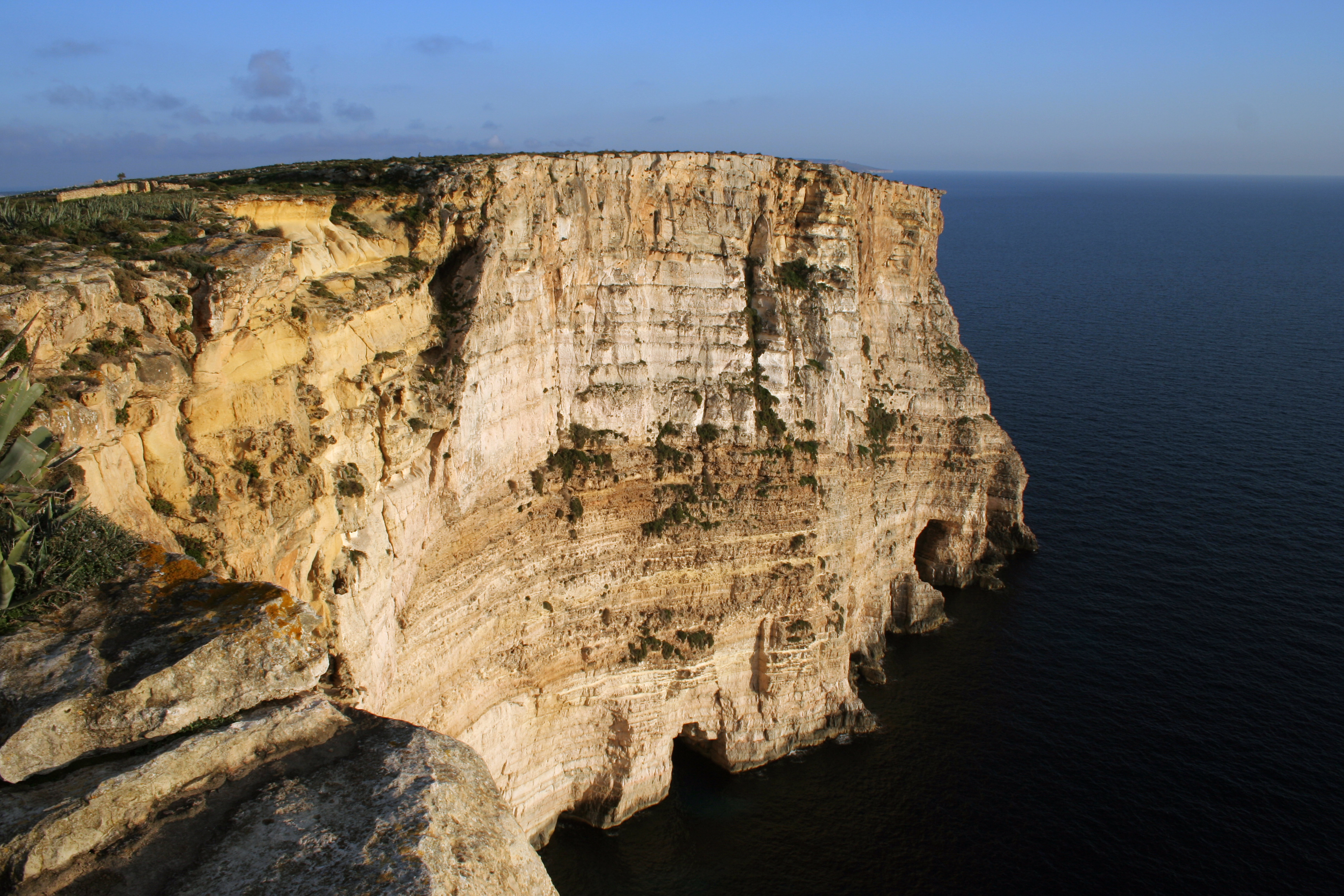
Dingli cliffs showing stratification in the Lower Coralline Limestone

=== Oligocene ===
==== Lower Coralline Limestone Formation ====
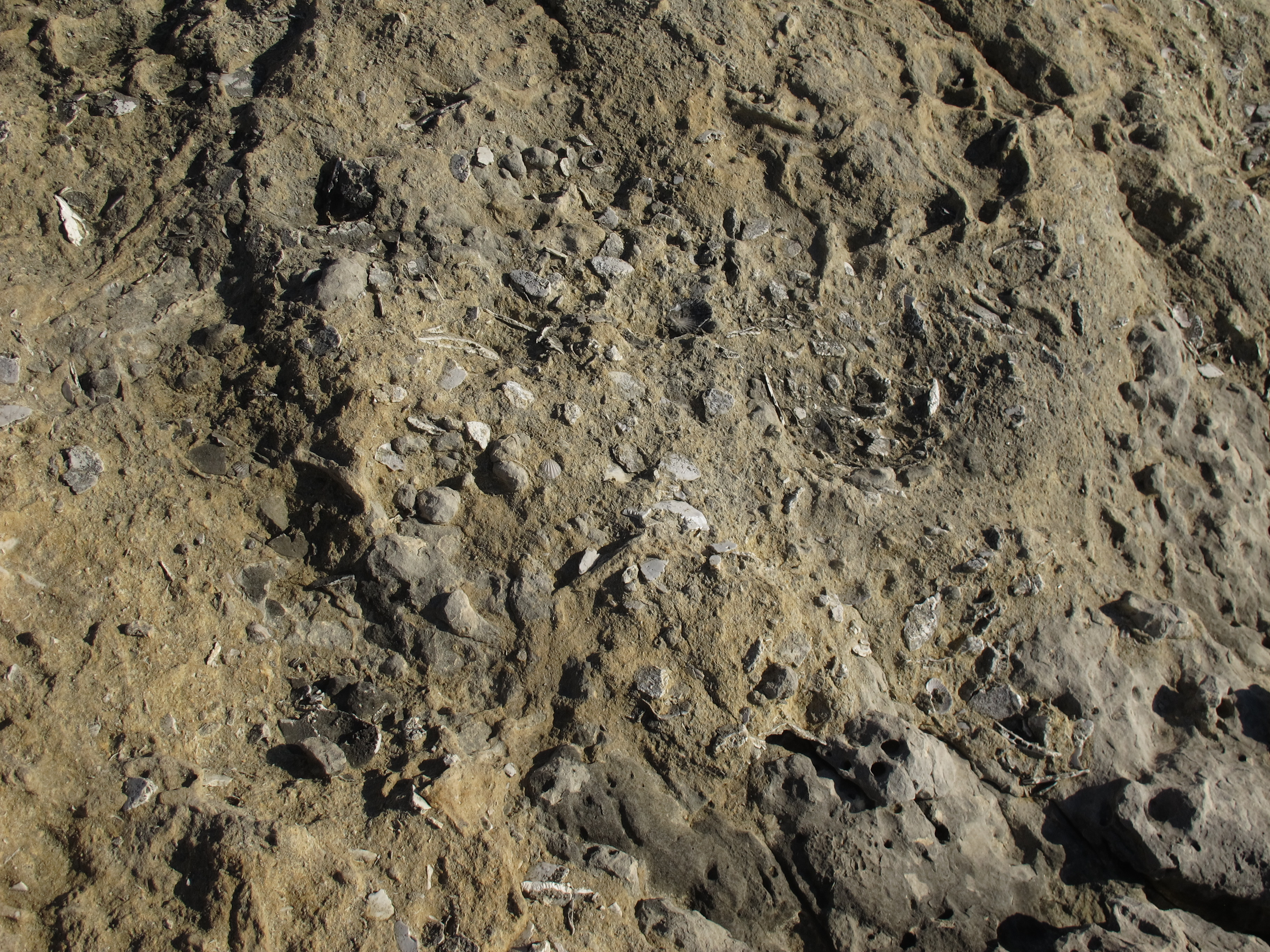
Hardground at the top of the Lower Coralline Limestone Formation with limestone clasts and fossils of the echinoid Scutella subrotunda and bivalves

The oldest exposed rock layer of Malta is the Lower Coralline Limestone Formation (Maltese: Żonqor), which is of Chattian age (~28–23 million years old) with a maximum thickness of 162 m. The unit is exposed on the lower parts of cliffs in the south-west of the archipelago such as at Dingli, and also along rifts, particularly near Mosta and Naxxar. This is a hard limestone which is pale grey in colour, and comparable to the Upper Coralline Limestone. At the top of this unit a hardground is generally developed indicating a period during which the seafloor was exposed. It is this formation of which the Azure Window, a spectacular coastal rock arch, popular with tourists and film-makers, was composed, prior to its final collapse in 2017.

=== Miocene ===
==== Globigerina Limestone Formation ====
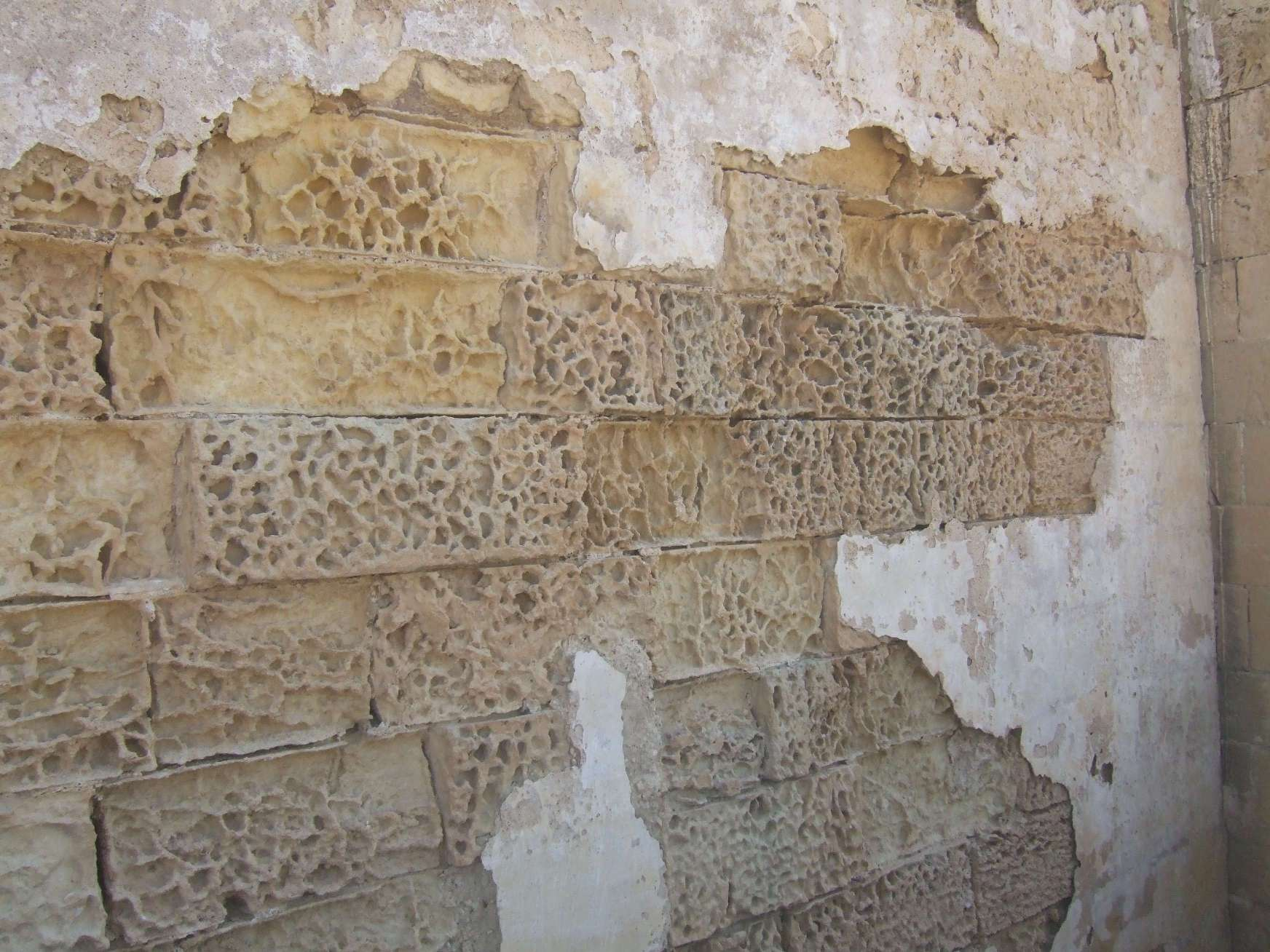
Limestone wall showing honeycomb weathering

The Globigerina Limestone (Maltese: Franka) is a soft, gold-coloured limestone of Aquitanian to Langhian age (~23–14 million years old), ranging in thickness from 23 m to 207 m. It contains many fossils, especially those of the foraminifera Globigerina that give it its name. It is divided into three members, the lower, middle and upper, with the boundaries between them being hardgrounds, representing the effects of further seabed exposure.

Since prehistoric times, this limestone has constituted the majority of building material used in Malta. Exposed to the air, the stone takes on a rosy colour, which browns with the formation of a protective patina. Lesser quality rocks can erode easily however, and can show honeycomb weathering. This rock has also been exported, and was used in the construction of the government palace of Corfu. The Maltese Lower Globigerina Limestone has been designated by the International Union of Geological Sciences as a Global Heritage Stone Resource.

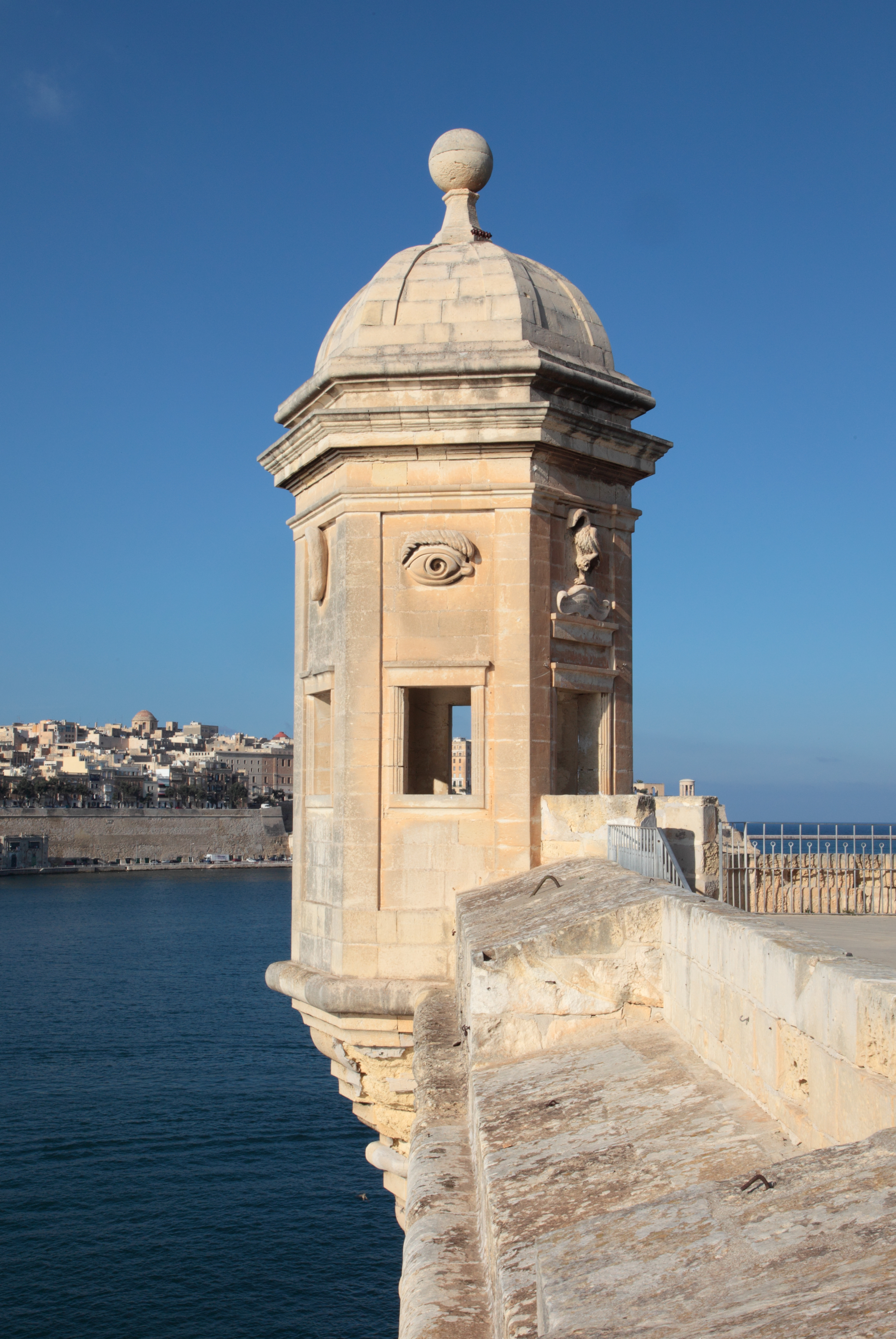
Gardjola Tower at Senglea, built from Globigerina Limestone

.

==== Blue Clay Formation ====
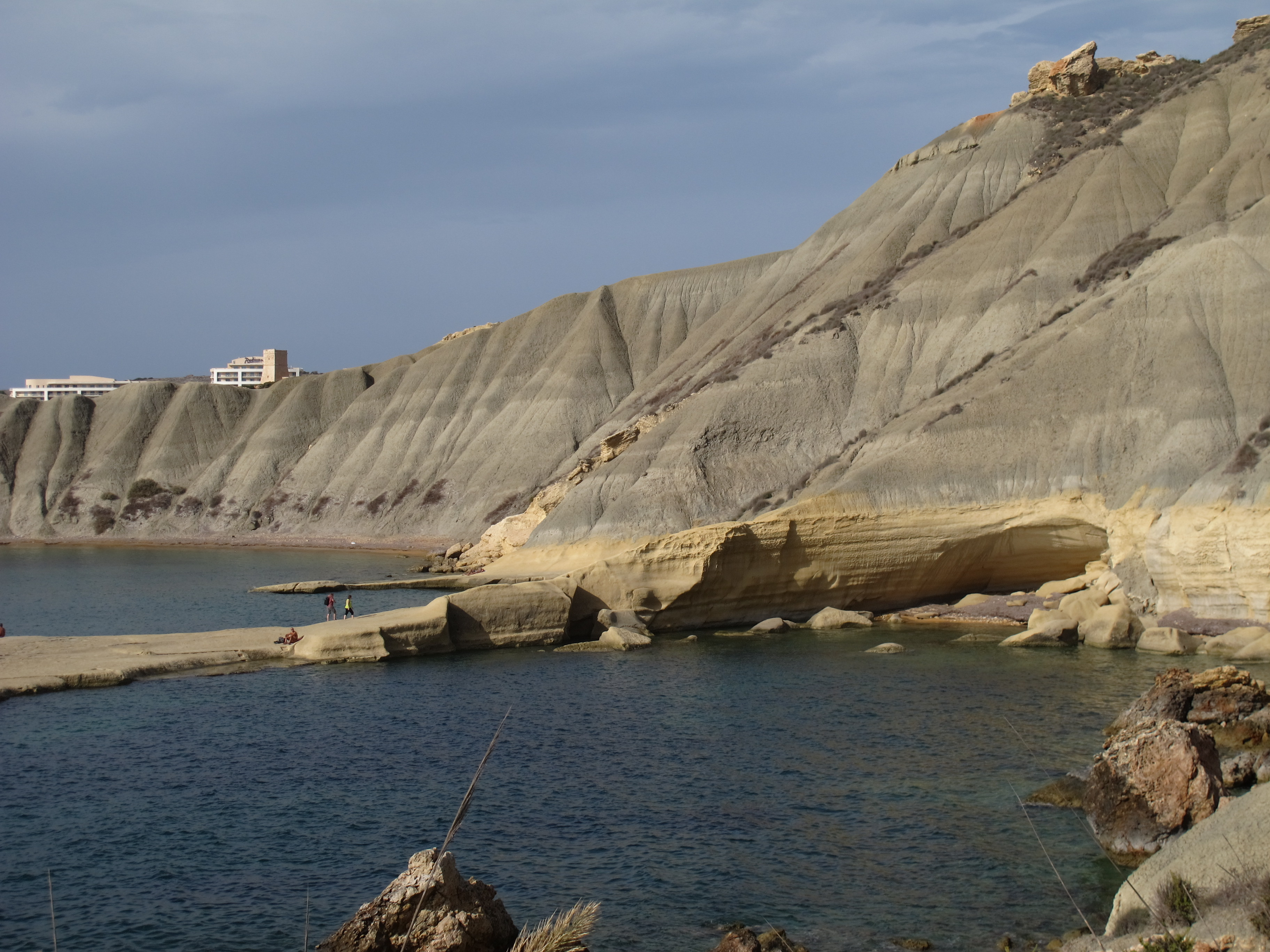
Blue Clay Formation exposed in the cliffs at the northern end of Ġnejna Bay overlying yellow-weathering Upper Globigerina Limestone

The Blue Clay (Maltese: Tafal) is a blue-gray mudstone of Langhian to Tortonian in age (~15–10 million years old) measuring up to 65 m thick. It shows major thickness variations and is missing completely from most of the eastern parts of the islands. It was deposited in a deepwater environment. It forms an impermeable layer beneath the Greensand and Upper Coralline Limestone formations. It is most visible in the northwest of Malta and the northeast of Gozo. It allows the capture of rainfall and the creation of aquifers. Water is extracted through wells or escapes through occasional springs when the topsoil has been eroded.

==== Greensand Formation ====
The Greensand (Maltese: Ġebla s-Safra) is a glauconite-bearing sandstone of Tortonian age (~10–7 million years old). Yellow-green in colour, it takes on an orange tint when it comes into contact with the air. It is generally very thin, a few tens of centimetres in most areas, with a maximum thickness of 11 m. It is friable and therefore unsuitable for building purposes. Its permeable nature and its position immediately above the Blue Clay allow for the infiltration of rainwater.

==== Upper Coralline Limestone Formation ====
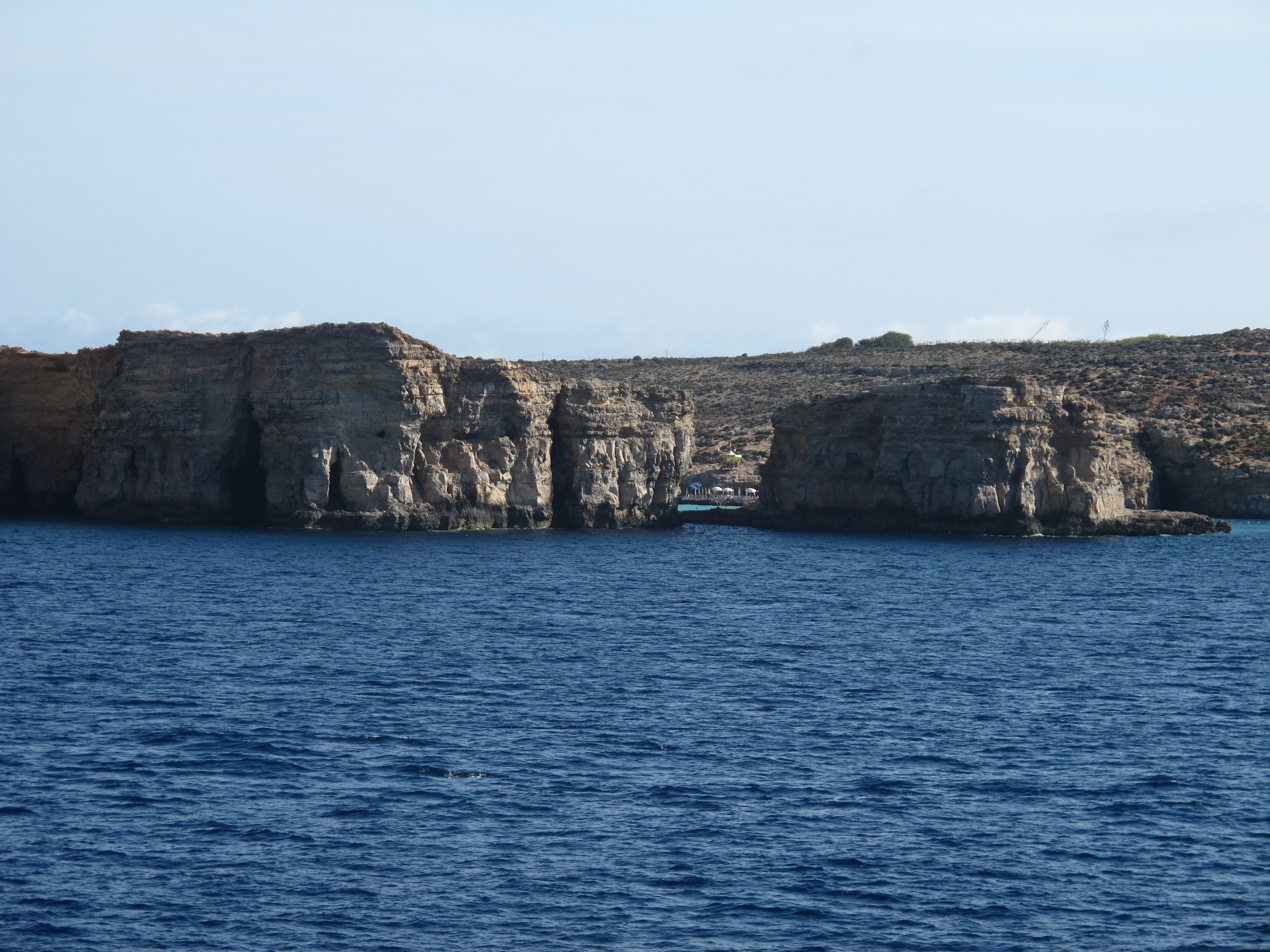
Cliffs of Upper Coralline Limestone Formation on islands at the western end of Comino

The top layer, the Upper Coralline Limestone (Maltese: Qawwi ta' Fuq), is the youngest formation of Messinian age (~7–5 million years old) and is around 140 m thick. It is mainly present on the islands of Malta, Comino and in the east of Gozo. It is highly varied across the islands, with a belt of biogenic structures called bioherms on the southern side of the archipelago. These were formed as the region was uplifting and relative sea level was dropping. With the rapid environmental change of the Messinian salinity crisis, the system that produced the Upper Coralline Limestone had died out. The Coralline Limestone is a hard, pale-grey limestone. It was used frequently in constructions requiring great strength, and in fortifications in particular.

== Faults ==
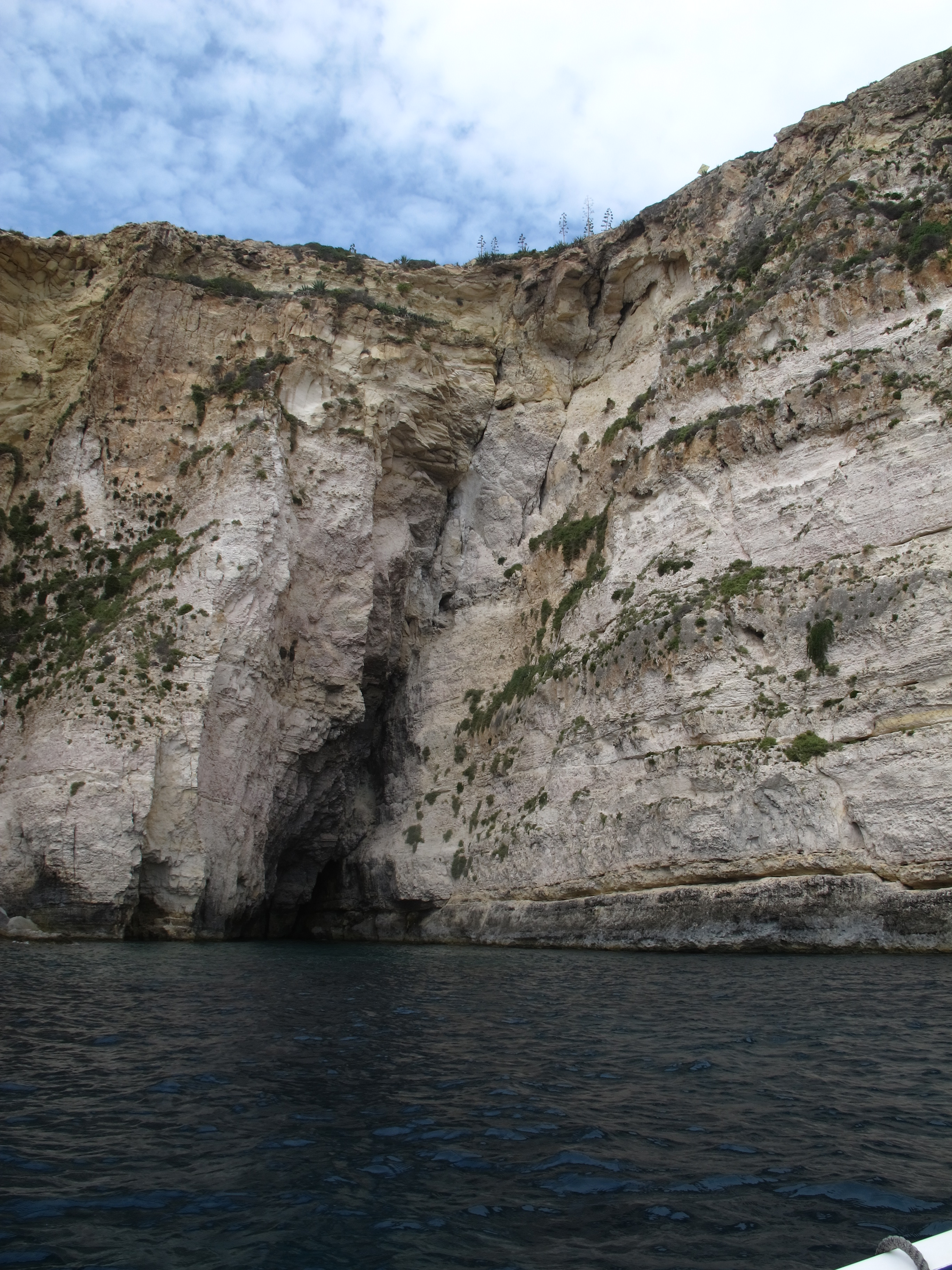
SW-dipping minor fault on the southwest coast of Malta, near the Blue Grotto

The rock layers in Malta are relatively flat-lying, with the exception of zones where the rock has been folded close to faults. The faults have two main orientations, with the largest faults being northwest-southeast trending, parallel to the line of islands, although these faults are only locally exposed, and a second set that are WSW-ENE trending, with generally small displacements that dominate the topography of the islands. The largest of the second set are the Victoria Lines Fault on northern Malta and the Qala Fault on southern Gozo. The fault is around 18.5 kilometres (11.5 mi) long.

Overall, the islands of the archipelago are tilted towards the northeast, with cliffs on the southwest coast and descending gradients towards the northeast.

== Recent geological history ==
The Maltese archipelago is linked to Sicily by an underwater plateau of depths of less than 100 m. During different marine regressions of the Mediterranean, Malta has been connected to Sicily by a surface isthmus by which animals have been able to cross, as evinced by the presence of island dwarfism in Maltese dwarf hippopotamus and dwarf elephant fossils, as well as island gigantism (fossils of the Maltese Giant Dormouse, Leithia melitensis).
