= Lioz =

Ornamental limestone from Portugal

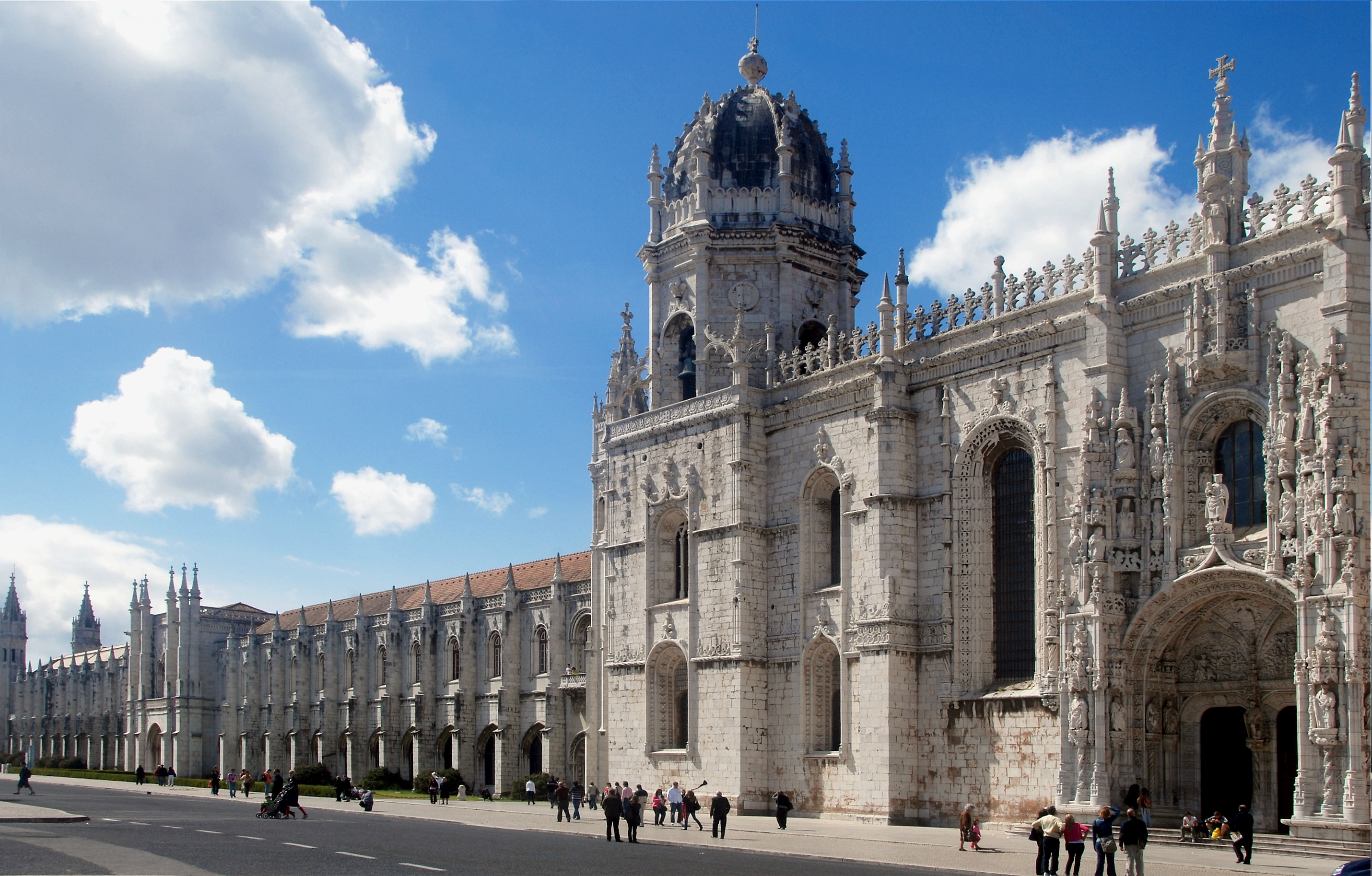
Jerónimos Monastery, in Lisbon.

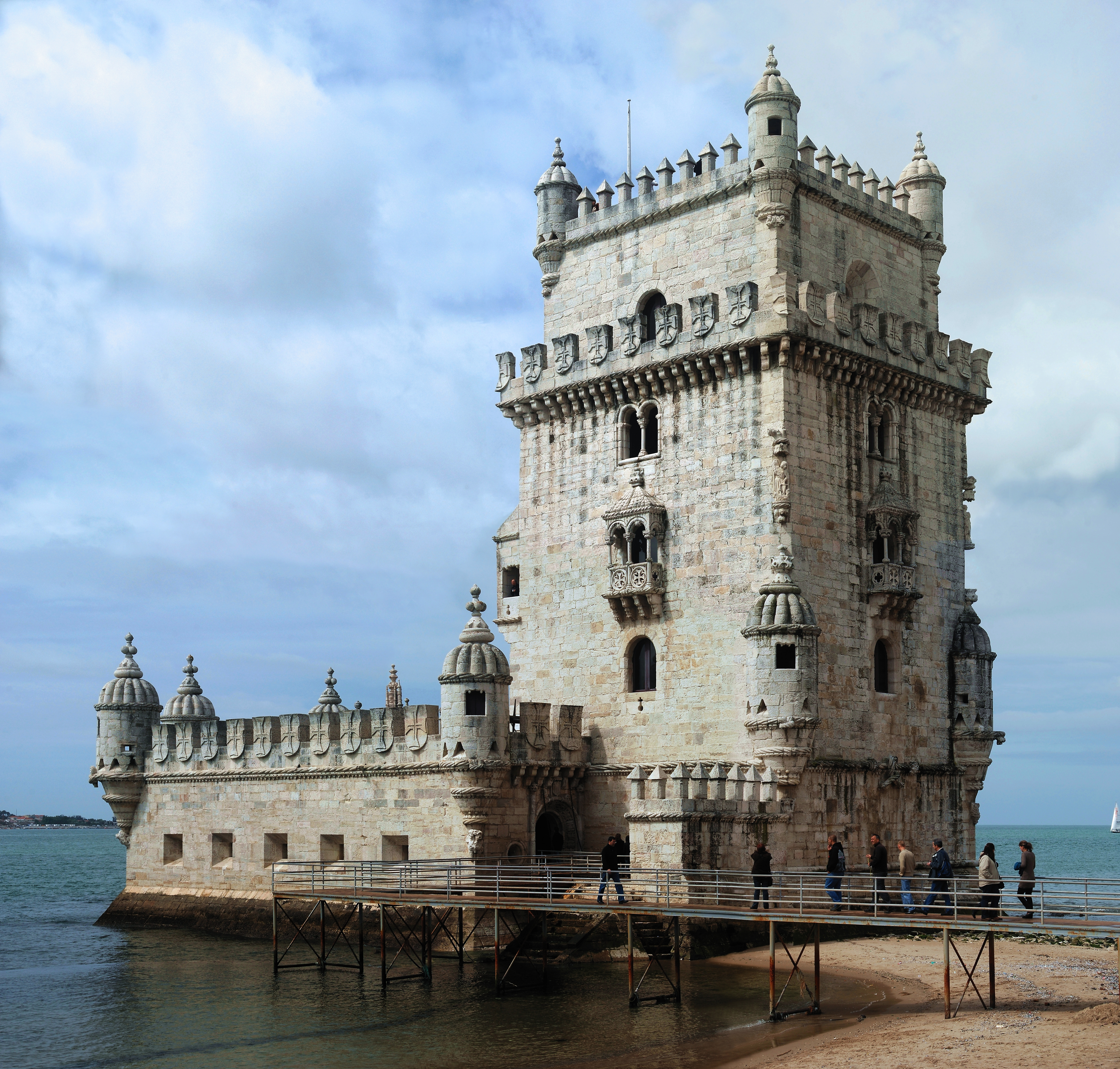
Belém Tower, in Lisbon.

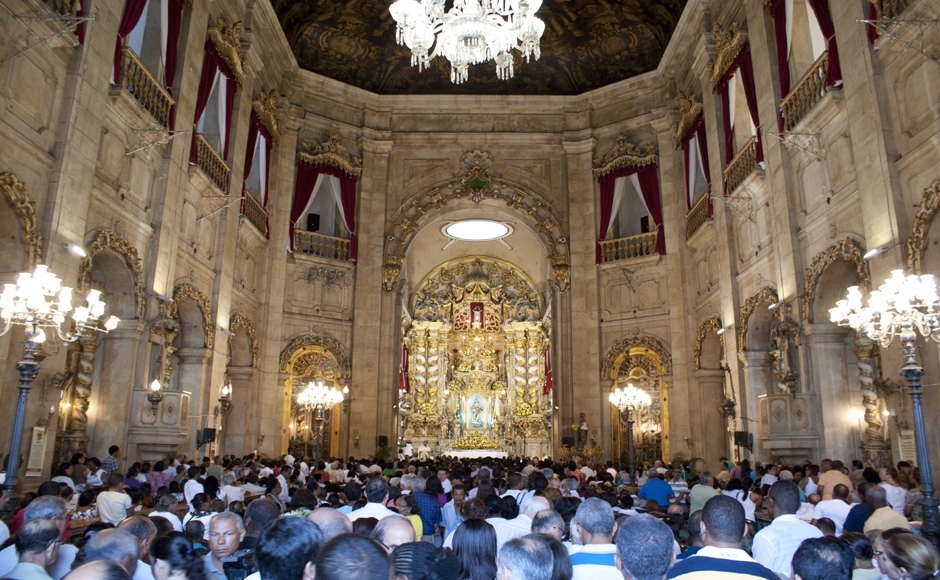
Basilica of the Immaculate Conception, Salvador, Brazil.

Lioz (Portuguese: pedra lioz), also known as Royal Stone (pedra real), is a type of limestone, originating in Portugal, from the Lisbon region. It is famed for its use as an ornamental stone, resulting in its proliferation in palaces, cathedrals, and important civic buildings throughout Portugal and the former Portuguese Empire. Owing to its historical relevance, lioz was designated a Global Heritage Stone Resource.

== Characteristics ==
Lioz stone contains rudist fossils dating back 120 million years. Its color is generally ivory but varies from light grey to whitish and rosy. This type of limestone is used as a decorative construction material because of its fossiliferous composition.

During the XVII–XVIII centuries lioz was widely used in churches, monuments and official buildings in Portugal, as well as some Portuguese colonies (Salvador, Bahia, Brazil), therefore, it was also called “royal stone”. Lioz stone has been designated by the International Union of Geological Sciences as a Global Heritage Stone Resource.

== Notable buildings ==
Monuments made of lioz include:

Portugal:

- Jeronimos Monastery
- Belém Tower
- Belém Cultural Centre
- Rossio Station
- Mafra Palace

Brazil:

- Cathedral of Salvador
- Basilica of the Immaculate Conception

== See also ==
- Limestone
