= EF =

EF or ef may refer to:

== Arts and entertainment ==
- Ef (band), a post-rock band from Sweden
- Ef: A Fairy Tale of the Two., a Japanese adult visual novel series by Minori, or its anime adaptations

== Businesses and organizations ==
- Eagle Forum, an anti-feminist conservative interest group
- Earth First!, movement, in environmentalism
- Eastern Fare, a music institution and production house in Bangalore, India
- EF Education First, an international education organization
- Far Eastern Air Transport (IATA code EF)
- Ethereum Foundation, Swiss non-profit foundation

== Linguistics ==
- Ef (Cyrillic) (Ф, ф), a letter in the Cyrillic alphabet
- F (F, f), a letter in the Latin alphabet

== Science ==
=== Biology and psychology ===
- Ejection fraction, in cardiovascular physiology
- Elongation factors, proteins that are important in protein synthesis
- Executive functions, a theorized cognitive system in psychology that controls and manages other cognitive processes

=== Physics ===
- Electric field, in physics
- Exafarad, an SI unit of electric capacitance
- Fermi energy or Fermi level (E_{F}), both concepts in quantum mechanics

=== Other sciences ===
- Ecological footprint, the measure of the demand the population has on the environment
- Enhanced Fujita scale (EF scale), an improved version of the Fujita scale used to rate the intensity of tornadoes
- Ice cap climate, which is abbreviated to EF in the Köppen climate classification

== Technology ==
- Canon EF camera, a manual focus 35mm SLR
- Canon EF lens mount, Canon's autofocus lens mount
- Entity Framework, an object-relational mapping (ORM) framework for the .NET Framework
- Expedited Forwarding, a priority class in IP traffic

== Other uses ==
- Extraordinary Form, a phrase used to describe the Catholic liturgy of the 1962 Roman Missal
- Era Fascista, the Italian fascist calendar
- Extra fine, a condition of a coin
- Eurofurence, a furry convention in Hamburg, Germany
