= Supplier-furnished equipment =

In aviation, when an aircraft is built and delivered, it will come with supplier-furnished equipment (SFE): materials and parts provided by the manufacturer.

The opposite of SFE is buyer-furnished equipment (BFE), which is purchased by the buyer and given to the aircraft manufacturer to be installed before delivery by the manufacturer. BFE includes preferred galley equipment (ovens for example). In many cases, the aircraft is designed to accommodate BFE during the initial engineering phase.

In contrast is buyer-installed equipment (BIE). BIE is when provision is made for specific equipment the buyer will buy and install- e.g., first aid kits and life vests.
