= English Stone Forum =

- Industry: Dimension stone, building conservation
- Area served: England
- Key people: Terry Hughes (Chairman)
- Website: http://www.englishstone.org.uk/

The English Stone Forum (ESF) is an organisation which supports the use of building stone, or dimension stone, produced in England. It works to:

- encourage greater public interest in and awareness of the stone built heritage of England and the threats it faces;
- encourage the use of English stone for the public benefit and to;
- ensure the availability of the stone required for the maintenance of the built heritage and new build.

It is chaired by Terry Hughes and governed by representatives of British and English organisations active in the study and production of building stone, the training of stonemasons, architects and conservation professionals and the conservation of historic buildings and structures. The forum's website provides information on building and roofing stone and issues about its supply and use. It invites suggestions for further activities and can be contacted through its website. There is a similar organisation for Welsh stone.

== History ==
From 1990 it had become increasingly apparent that difficulties in obtaining authentic stone were seriously hampering the repair and conservation of historic and listed buildings in the UK. This situation had come about because of a number of factors including:

- the decline of the UK dimension stone industry and the closing of many quarries;
- the development of elaborate environmental protection legislation and the lack of building conservation legislation of equal strength;
- a planning system which penalised small scale quarrying;
- lack of understanding of the technical importance of specifying the original stone for repairs;
- the loss of old quarries to brown field development for landfill, factories and houses or as country parks and nature reserves
- public misunderstanding of the small scale of dimension stone quarrying compared with aggregate production
- lack of knowledge about the historical sources of building stone

The consequence was that dimension stone quarrying became increasingly uneconomical and unpalatable especially for small scale operators.

In response to this situation and with the support of English Heritage, the Deputy Prime Minister’s Office (now the Department of Communities and Local Government Department for Communities and Local Government) commissioned a report Planning for the Supply of Natural Building and Roofing Stone in England and Wales (known as The Symonds Report). Published in 2004 it reviewed the state of supply and demand for building stone and the planning environment in which it operated. It recommended:

- revisions to minerals planning policy
- designations of heritage quarries
- creation of a national database of building and roofing stones including their
  - Description
  - Suitability
  - Existing sources
  - Extent of unworked resources
  - Constraints on production and
  - Importance

A summary of the report is available from Communities and Local Government Publications.

Similar problems had been identified by building conservation organisations in Scotland and Wales and had resulted in the formation of the Scottish Stone Liaison Group (now closed) and the Welsh Stone Forum. In 2005 the Geoconservation Commission of the Geological Society of London organised a conference which supported the creation of a similar organisation for England. The ESF held its first meeting in 2006. It meets three times a year and publishes notes of the meeting and an annual summary of activities on its website.

== Members ==
- Historic England
- Stone Federation Great Britain
- British Geological Survey
- Royal Institute of British Architects
- National Stone Centre
- Institute of Historic Building Conservation
- Building Research Establishment
- Stone Roofing Association
- Planning Officers Society
- Mineral Products Association

== Policy on stone supply for building conservation and repair ==
The English Stone Forum supports the national policy on planning for stone supply in England. National policy is the responsibility of the Department for Communities and Local Government (DCLG) while local policies and decisions on planning applications rest with local minerals planning authorities. The main threads of national policy are that:

- Historic buildings should be repaired and conserved by using stone which is technically compatible with the original stone used in the building. In practical terms, this will normally mean a stone from the same or a similar, nearby source. It is well established that incompatible stones with, for example, a different porosity to the original stone can lead to the latter’s rapid deterioration as well as detracting from the building's appearance and beauty.
- Stones traditionally used in an area should be used, where appropriate, for new buildings in conservation areas.
- Sources of important stone should be safeguarded from development which would make them unavailable. Safeguarding became government policy in 2006 under the Mineral Policy Statement 1 (MPS1), Annex 3 Natural building and roofing stone and the associated Practice guide (building and roofing stones).
- Stone can only be produced from where it occurs in the ground. This inevitably leads to difficulties where there are other interests or designations such as environmental protection, scientific interest or amenity value in the same place. ESF supports the view that a balanced approach should be taken to proposals to extract an historic stone. This should be based on the relative significance of the stone and the environmental, scientific or amenity value of the site. To this end it supports the development of a ranking system for the importance of stone based on the scale, time and geographical extent of its historic use, the importance of the buildings it has been used in and its special technical features. This system would result in designations of nationally, regionally and locally important stones (as recommended in the report prepared by Symonds). The designation should then be compared with the relative importance of other interests in the site.

ESF is also supporting and contributing views to a scheme for the designation of Global Heritage Building Stones which is being developed by the International Association for Engineering Geology and the Environment.

- The English Stone Forum considers that it is illogical and impractical to require a proposal to extract stone to demonstrate that similar stone could not be produced from some other place somewhere in the UK. This would constitute proving a negative.

== Publications ==
Publications are produced on stone sourcing, production and use; minerals planning and building conservation. ESF's smaller publications can be downloaded from the media, issues, information and publications pages of the website. England's Heritage in Stone, Doyle P, Hughes T G, Thomas I A, (eds) 2005, Update 17 March 2011 England's Heritage in Stone is now out of print but copies have been supplied to most English universities and colleges which provide building conservation courses. Copies are also available in all the UK legal deposit libraries.
