= Tal-Virtù Church =

- The Church of the Assumption of Mary tal-Virtù
- Il-Knisja ta' Santa Marija tal-Virtù
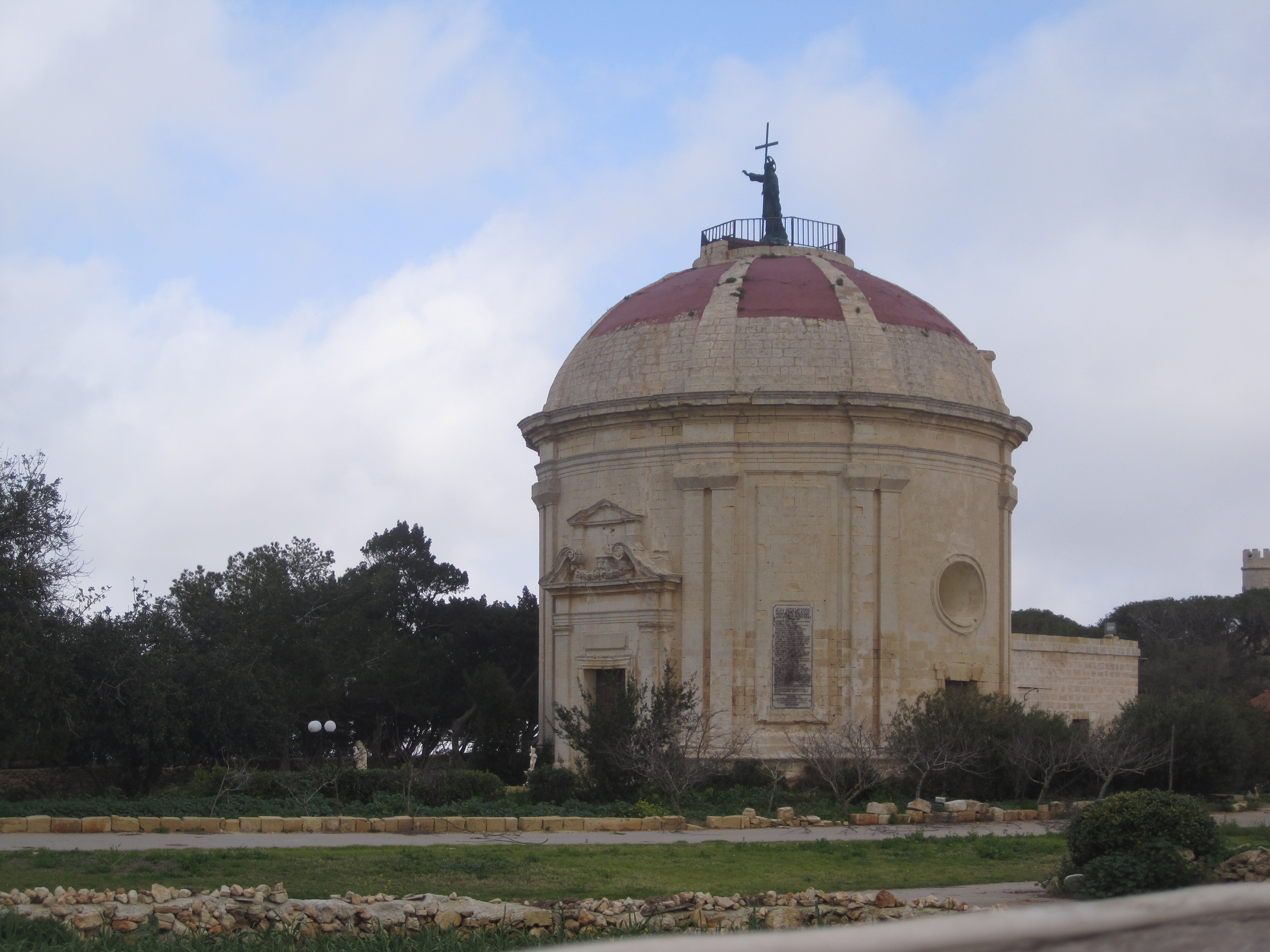

- Location within Malta
- 35°52′25.0″N 14°24′23.9″E
- Location: Rabat
- Country: Malta
- Denomination: Roman Catholic

History
- Status: Active
- Founded: 1438
- Dedication: Assumption of Mary

Architecture
- Functional status: Church
- Groundbreaking: 1717
- Completed: 1723

Administration
- Archdiocese: Malta

Clergy
- Archbishop: Charles Scicluna

Tal- Virtu Church known formally as the Church of the Assumption of Mary of tal-Virtù, is a Roman Catholic Round church located in the outskirts of the town of Rabat, in Malta, on top of the hill known as Tal-Virtù, receiving its name from the church.

== The Medieval crypt ==
The church was built on top of an area where multiple graves deriving from the times of the Punics, Phoenicians and the Romans were excavated. An early Christian catacomb beneath the church was also excavated. The catacomb was changed into a medieval Christian crypt and a gothic doorway was built. The crypt was mentioned in numerous reports, notably inquisitor Pietro Dusina's account of his visit to the crypt in 1575. He mentions that the crypt had numerous altars. The crypt was mentioned again in 1647 by Giovanni Francesco Abela who writes that the crypt had one altar. In 1722 the crypt is mentioned once more by the Bishop of Malta Gaspare Gori-Mancini. The crypt still exists till this day, beneath the church.

== The first church ==
The first church was built over the crypt in 1436, possibly earlier. It is not known in which form the church was built however most probably it had a rectangular plan with an apse. The ceiling might also have been supported with pointed arches, typical architecture for Maltese medieval churches. The church had one bell tower and a round window on the facade. Dusina's visit in 1575 reports that the church has one altar with a painting covered by a yellow drape. In 1615 another painting was mentioned and which was attributed to a notable artist. Another cloth that covers the painting was also mentioned, this time a purple drape. The church was given to the Augustinians on December 4, 1659.

== The round church ==
The church suffered considerable damage after the 1693 earthquake. Plans were made to rebuild rather than restore the church. Plans for the church were designed on those of Sarria Church in Floriana. Construction commenced in 1717 and was completed by 1723 under the supervision of Petruzzo Debono. Interior carvings were done by Benedetto Saliba in 1731. In 1444, Archbishop Paul Alphéran de Bussan mentions that the church had numerous art works depicting the Virgin Mary and other saints. Ex votos were also hung near the painting of the Virgin Mary, indicating that the church served as a devotion spot for many.

In 1901 a statue depicting Jesus the Redeemer was installed on the dome of the church. Consequently, a feast in honor of Jesus the Redeemer took place every year. In 1923 the church was badly damaged as a result of an earthquake. Attempts were made to restore it but the church was declared unsafe. The statue of the Redeemer was removed to fears of collapse. The statue was instead installed on a pedestal in front of the church. Consequently, the church was abandoned and instead of serving as a place of worship to God, the church started to be used as a place for satanic rituals. The church was vandalised numerous times with various graffiti written on its walls. In 1986 the statue of the Redeemer was removed from the premises of the church and was restored and reinstalled in the grounds of the Major Seminary, near by. Works on restoration commenced in 1988. Another statue of the Redeemer was installed on the dome. A copy of the original painting was installed in the church since the original was taken by the Wignacourt Museum in Rabat.

== See also ==
- Buhagiar, Mario (1979). "The crypt and church of S. Marija tal-Virtu' at Rabat" (PDF). Melita Historica. 7 (4): 326–345. Archived from the original on April 16, 2016.
