= Federation of European Scouting =

Federation of European Scouting or Fédération du Scoutisme Européen may refer to:

- International Union of Guides and Scouts of Europe (Union Internationale des Guides et Scouts d'Europe – Fédération du Scoutisme Européen, UIGSE-FSE)
- several member organizations of the Confédération Européenne de Scoutisme; among them
  - European Scout Federation (British Association) (FSE).
