= Exchange of futures for swaps =

Futures-swap exchange transaction

An exchange of futures for swaps (EFS) is a transaction negotiated privately in which a futures contract for a physical item is exchanged for a cash settled swap contract. It is similar to an EFP except that it involves a cash contract rather than a physicals contract. An EFS gives the market participants a chance to liquidate a swap position in an environment that is normally not very liquid.

== Regulatory treatment and terminology ==
On CME Group markets, exchange of futures for swaps is treated as part of the broader category of exchange for related position (EFRP) transactions. CME defines an exchange of futures for risk (EFR) as the simultaneous execution of an exchange futures contract and a corresponding over-the-counter swap or other OTC derivative transaction.

CME Group’s glossary also defines an exchange for swap (EFS) as a privately negotiated transaction in which a futures position is exchanged for a swap position, reflecting the older, more specific terminology for a swap-based EFRP. CME has since noted in regulatory materials that legacy references to exchange for swap have been modified to exchange for risk in order to harmonize terminology across its rulebooks.
