= SEF =

SEF may refer to:

- Sankara Eye Foundation, a non-profit that works for eradicating curable blindness in India
- Serviço de Estrangeiros e Fronteiras, Portuguese Border and Alien Service
- Sinfonia Educational Foundation, the philanthropic arm of the Phi Mu Alpha Sinfonia Music Fraternity
- Small Enterprise Foundation, a microfinance institution operating primarily in the Limpopo province of South Africa
- South Eastern Freeway, a Freeway in Australia
- Special Emergency Force, A Saudi Arabian riot control and counter-terrorism force
- Spectral edge frequency, a measure used in signal processing
- Stadio Erinis & Filias, the Greek name for Peace and Friendship Stadium, an indoor sports arena in Athens
- Straits Exchange Foundation, a semi-official organization of Taiwan that deals with the business matters with China
- Supplementary eye fields, areas in the primate brain that are involved in planning and control of saccadic eye movements
- Swap Execution Facility, a platform for regulated trading and clearing of swaps to be required in the United States by the Dodd-Frank bill
- Swedish Elite Football
- Swedish Electricians' Union, a trade union in Sweden
- Seaford railway station (England), a railway station in Sussex, England
- Secondary eyewall formation, a phenomenon observed in powerful tropical cyclones

See also:

- Sef, Iran (disambiguation)
- Sef Gonzales, Asian-Australian murderer
