= Exchange of futures for physicals =

In finance, an exchange of futures for physicals (EFP) is a transaction between two parties in which a futures contract on a commodity is exchanged for the actual physical good. This transaction involves a privately negotiated exchange of a futures position for a corresponding position in the underlying physical. An EFP is similar to an EFS, except that it involves a physical contract rather than a cash swap contract. An EFP gives the market participants the ability to manage risk.
