= Écoles Sans Frontières =

Educational organization based in France

Écoles Sans Frontières ("Schools Without Borders") is a French non-governmental organisation (NGO) dedicated to supporting access to education for disadvantaged populations and refugees. The organisation operates through a network of volunteers and international partners, with activities aimed at promoting education, human development, and the preservation of cultural identity among vulnerable communities.

The organisation's stated mission is to:

"defend the basic right to education in the respect of human dignity. To develop education and human resources for the underprivileged populations and to contribute to the safeguard of their culture of origin. To facilitate, by teaching, the search for durable solutions for the refugees".

The organisation's motto is L'instruction, c'est l'espoir ("Education is hope"), reflecting its focus on education as a means of improving social conditions and supporting communities affected by poverty, displacement, and limited educational opportunities.

== Activities ==
Écoles Sans Frontières focuses on educational support for communities with limited access to schooling and learning resources. Its volunteers participate in educational initiatives designed to provide learning opportunities for children and adults in disadvantaged environments.

The organisation's work includes supporting educational programmes in refugee settings, where access to formal education may be disrupted by displacement, conflict, or economic difficulties. Through education and training initiatives, ESF aims to assist communities while respecting their cultural backgrounds and local identities.

== International work ==
Although based in France, Écoles Sans Frontières has an international scope through its volunteers and overseas activities. The organisation has worked with disadvantaged populations in regions including Southeast Asia, Haiti, and Guatemala, particularly in refugee camps and communities where educational resources are limited.

Its international approach is based on cooperation with local communities and the belief that education can contribute to long-term social development and greater opportunities for vulnerable populations.

== Organisation and volunteers ==
Écoles Sans Frontières relies on volunteers who contribute to educational projects and humanitarian activities. The organisation's volunteer-based model allows it to operate across different regions while adapting educational programmes to local needs and circumstances.

== See also ==
- List of Without Borders organizations
- Education for All
- Right to education
