= Government College of Technology, Coimbatore =

Engineering college in Coimbatore, Tamil Nadu, India

Government College of Technology, Coimbatore.
- Emblem of GCT Coimbatore
- Type: Public, Autonomous
- Established: 1945; 81 years ago
- Dean: K Manonmani
- Location: Coimbatore, Tamil Nadu, India; 11.018208°N 76.936011°E
- Campus: Urban
- Website: http://www.gct.ac.in

Government College of Technology, Coimbatore (GCT) is an autonomous state-funded engineering college located in Coimbatore, Tamil Nadu, India. It is affiliated to Anna University.

== History ==
Government College of Technology, Coimbatore was founded in 1945 as Arthur Hope College of Technology, named after Arthur Hope, Governor of Madras Presidency (1940–46) under the patronage of philanthropist G.D. Naidu. The college was modelled after the then famous Germany’s technical institutions with inputs by the Stoll family and Hermann WeilerIn June 1950, the college moved to the present site of about 45 hectares on Thadagam Road, Coimbatore. The main building of the college was inaugurated by President Dr. Sarvepalli Radhakrishnan on October 8, 1959.

== Student life ==
The various forums and clubs include Society of Automotive Engineers (SAE-GCT Collegiate Club), GCT-Motorsports, Mechanical Engineering Association, Biotech Forum, Civil Engineering Association, Computer Science and Engineering Association (CSEA), Information Technology Association (ITA), Electrical, Electronics and Instrumentation Engineering Association (EEEIEA), Electronics and Communication Engineering Association (ECEA), Production Engineering Association (PEA), Student Branch of IEEE, ISTE chapter, Administration Aspirants Council(AAC), Rotaract club, Green club, Science club, Y's club, Fine arts club, MuFX GCT(Orchestra), Literary and Debating Society, Tamil Mandram. Student Journalist Council-GCT is the official media body of the GCT. The first edition of Aperture, the student e-Newsletter of GCT was launched on 21 February 2014. The Rotaract club of GCT earned the "Well-balanced Club" award at the Rotaract District Assembly 2017. 'Eliminators' is the official dance team of GCT. The Administration Aspirants Council (AAC) is a council for developing the UPSC Civil Services Aspirants among the GCT students. It has set up an own Library called AAC LIBRARY within the college campus with the permission of the respected Principal and with the funds provided by the GCT Alumni Association (GCTAA). AAC Library is opened for 24 hours and students conduct early morning and late-night classes among themselves and have interviewed many bureaucrats of our nation in their official YouTube channel.

== Rankings ==
College rankings

Engineering – India
- NIRF (2024): 201-300

The National Institutional Ranking Framework (NIRF) ranked the college between 201-300 in the engineering rankings in 2024.

== Notable alumni ==
- Mylswamy Annadurai, former director ISRO Satellite Centre, Padma Shri Awardee.
- B. Codanayaguy, Indian Rocket Scientist, Nari Shakti Puraskar Awardee.
- N. Valarmathi, scientist, project director of RISAT-1, and the first person to receive Abdul Kalam Award.
- Thamarai, poet, lyricist, writer and journalist
- S. Ramakrishnan, founder president of Amar Seva Sangam, Padma Shri Awardee.
- Padmanaban Gopalan, Indian social entrepreneur and founder of No Food Waste (NFW).
- Nagasubramanian Chokkanathan, Tamil writer and novelist.
- Vijay Anand (politician), anti-corruption activist.
- Satish Dharmaraj, managing director at Redpoint Ventures, American entrepreneur, speaker, angel investor and venture capitalist.
- Swami Manohar, First Recipient of Dewang Mehta Award for innovation in IT, Co-founder Picopeta Simputers, Strand, Limberlink Tech and Escape Velocity Accelerator
- V. C. Kulandaiswamy Indian Academic, Author, Padma Shri and Padma Bhushan awardee.

== See also ==
- List of Tamil Nadu Government's Educational Institutions
- List of Tamil Nadu Government's Engineering Colleges
