= Acompli =

Mobile email app for iOS

- Operating system: iOS, Android
- Platform: iPhone, Android devices
- Type: Email client
- Website: acompli.com

Acompli is a discontinued mobile app that allowed for user interaction with email messages as well as management of multiple email accounts in one programme. In addition, the tool also organized one's calendar and shared files. This application provided for integration with cloud storage platforms such as Dropbox, OneDrive, and iCloud; it also carried support for Microsoft Exchange and Gmail. Acompli launched on 24 April 2014. The startup company, which had $7.3 million in funding, was led by CEO Javier Soltero, J.J. Zhuang (CTO) and Kevin Henrikson (VP of Engineering).

First released in April 2014 by the venture capital-backed startup of the same name, Acompli was acquired by Microsoft in December 2014. On January 29, 2015, Acompli was re-branded as Outlook Mobile—sharing its name with the Microsoft Outlook desktop personal information manager and Outlook.com email service.

== History ==
Acompli was co-founded as a startup by Javier Soltero, the former chief technology officer of VMWare, alongside JJ Zhuang (CTO), and Kevin Henrikson (VP of Engineering). It received $7.3 million in funding from Redpoint Ventures, Harrison Metal and Felicis Ventures. At Redpoint Ventures, Satish Dharmaraj played a pivotal role in bringing the founders together.

In order to distinguish itself from other recent email startups, such as Mailbox, Soltero decided to target the enterprise market—particularly, users of Microsoft Exchange servers. He felt that such users had been underserved by the lacking or non-existent support for Exchange in existing mail apps, believing that their developers—despite its wide adoption, "do not fathom the possibility of anyone using Exchange." A result of this mandate was the decision to make the app a personal information manager rather than only an email client, integrating a calendar, a list of recent contacts, and a list of recent files from attachments and cloud storage services.

Acompli was first released on April 25, 2014, for iOS. An Android version was released in September 2014. On November 26, 2014, an incomplete post on its official blog prematurely revealed that Acompli had been acquired by Microsoft. The acquisition, valued at over $200 million (~$268 million in 2025), was officially announced on December 1, 2014. Rajesh Jha, vice president of Microsoft's Outlook division, stated that "We’re excited about what’s possible as we build on the app’s success and bring it together with work currently in progress by the Outlook team." Soltero assured users that the Acompli app would not be discontinued, and would continue to receive regular updates. On January 29, 2015, Acompli was re-branded as Outlook Mobile, uniting it with one of its original influences.

== Purpose ==
The goal of Acompli was for users to be able to experience, on a mobile device, the full email functionality that a desktop computer normally provides. This mobile application's "innovation is its focus on bringing multiple features like calendaring, contacts, and file management into the application to ease the pain of application switching."

== Features ==
Engadget reported that Acompli featured "three integrated hubs: "Calendar," "Files" and "People," each with its own tab at the bottom of the screen," which eliminates the issue of app switching. Acompli prioritized email messages in order of importance and provides an integrated calendar view. Priority was given to the response rate to a particular contact and emails from frequently replied contacts were termed "Focused" messages. Users were able to delete emails by swiping their dominant thumb from right to left halfway across the screen. The mobile app also associated with other cloud storage platforms, including Dropbox, in addition to Google Drive and OneDrive (SkyDrive). Ryan Lawler of TechCrunch stated that Acompli "adds file management and scheduling directly into your inbox". Moreover, "calendaring and location sharing is built right into new email composition." Acompli supported "Microsoft Exchange, Office 365, Google Apps, Gmail, iCloud, Yahoo, Outlook.com, Hotmail, MSN and Live." In order to find a desired email, Acompli users were able to use "smart filters". This mobile application did this by sending one's "emails, appointments, files and contacts through its own servers to deliver all that data to your device and to make it searchable". Joel Mathis in Macworld wrote that Acompli allowed people to "browse all email attachments in the attachments list, and send them from your mobile inbox even if the file wasn’t downloaded to the phone." Acompli also had an autocomplete feature.

== Reception ==
Acompli received mostly positive reception: James Kendrick of ZDNet considered the app a "must-have" for bring your own device scenarios, citing its focused inbox, convergence, and support for both personal and business-oriented e-mail platforms. However, he felt that the calendar was not "fancy", and lacked different view modes. Noting its level of support for Gmail, quicker deletion gesture, along with its "clean approach" to filtering through emails and other content, Engadget argued that Acompli "can be a speedy and powerful tool if you're willing to take the time to learn its nuances."

Jordan Novet of VentureBeat wrote that "app, which pulls in calendar and contact information and files to help people get more done on their mobile devices, had catapulted to the No. 9 slot in the free productivity-app section of the app store" as of 25 April 2014. Joshua Brustein in Bloomberg Businessweek, has written that due to Microsoft's absence from the iPad, programmes like Acompli and Evernote have been successful. Jeremy Schoemaker stated that Acompli has been "an absolute game changer".

On the day of its release, Acompli quickly reached the top 10 free "Productivity" apps on the iOS App Store.

== Funding ==
Re/code, in addition to VentureBeat, reported that Acompli "has raised $7.3 million in funding led by Redpoint Ventures, with Harrison Metal and Felicis Ventures."

== Team ==
At the time of acquisition by Microsoft, Acompli had a relatively small team of 21.

1. Javier Soltero – CEO
2. Kevin Henrikson – VP Of Engineering
3. JJ Zhuang – CTO
4. Jiho Hahm
5. Tamara Steffens – SVP, Business Development
6. Brayn Sawler
7. Mike Deeks
8. Elisabeth Miles
9. Ogden Kent
10. Doug Kent
11. Vishwesh Jirgale
12. Abhinav Mishra
13. Sarang Vyas
14. Swapnil Jadhav
15. Andreas Homer
16. Peter Farago - CMO
17. Vipul Solanki
18. Patrick Brennan
19. Jon Travis
20. Keith Lazuka
21. Eddie Kim

== See also ==
- List of most downloaded Android applications
- Mailbox (application)
- Microsoft Outlook (mobile app)
