= Javier Soltero =

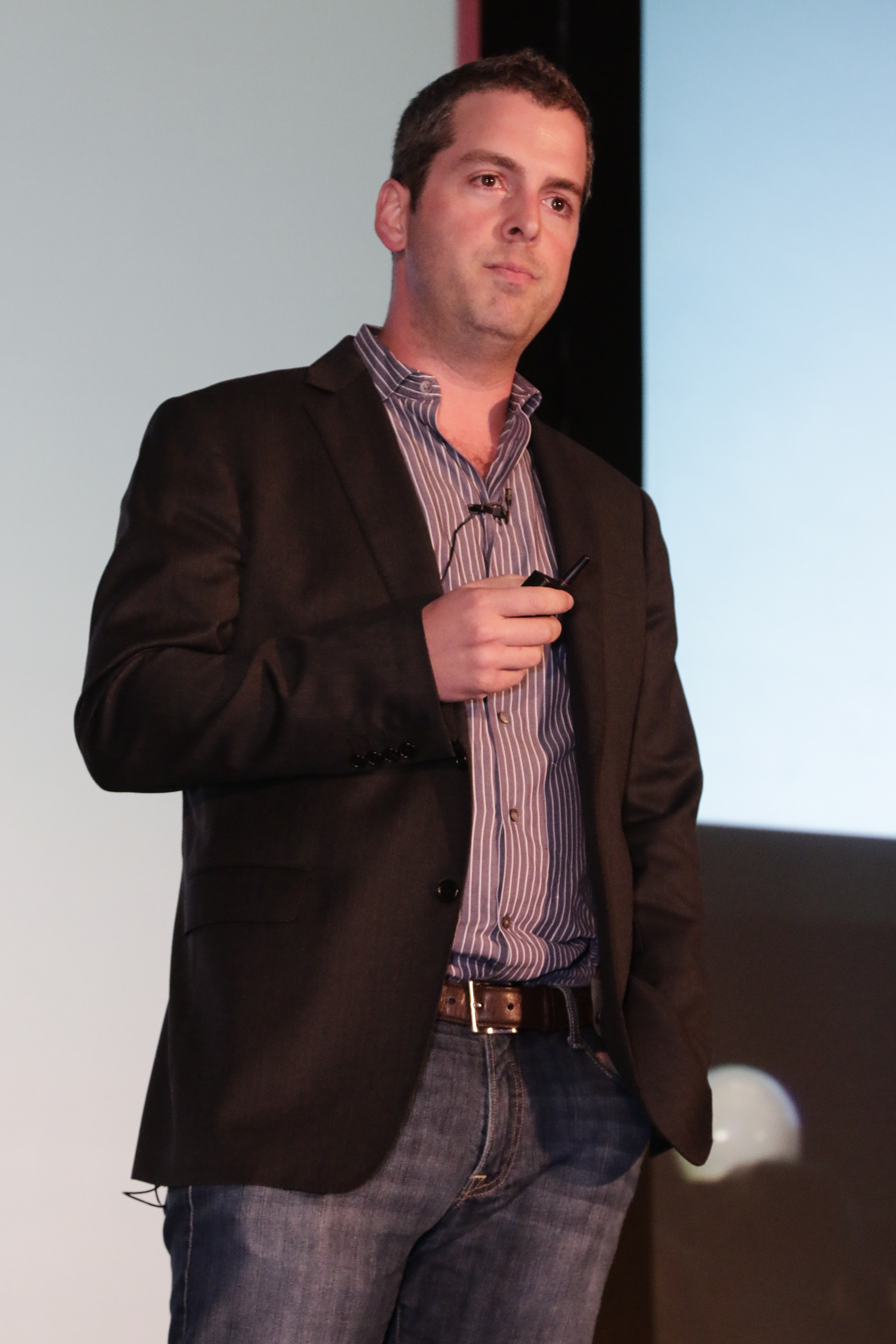
- Soltero speaking at the H3 conference in Puerto Rico
- Born: September 6, 1974 (age 51); San Juan, Puerto Rico
- Education: Carnegie Mellon University
- Occupations: General Manager and Vice President of Google Workspace, Google

Javier Soltero is a Puerto Rican entrepreneur and executive. Previously, he was the Corporate Vice President advisor to Rajesh Jha at Microsoft. Prior to Microsoft, he was co-founder and CEO of Acompli, after being an Entrepreneur-in-Residence at Redpoint Ventures. Most recently, he was General Manager and Vice President of Google Workspace at Google until July 2022.

== Career ==
Soltero received a Bachelor of Science degree in Information Systems and Industrial Management from Carnegie Mellon University in 1997. Upon graduation, he started work at Netscape where he helped build internet infrastructure technologies. He then became a senior engineer at BackFlip.com before co-founding Hyperic in 2004. Hyperic provided monitoring and management software for all types of web applications and was acquired by SpringSource in 2009. As a result, Soltero became the CTO of Managed Products at SpringSource. SpringSource was eventually acquired by VMWare for $420 million.

Soltero co-founded Acompli in 2013, with Kevin Henrikson and JJ Zhuang where he served as the company's CEO. Acompli was a company which built email mobile applications and raised $7.3 million in venture capital financing. Acompli was acquired by Microsoft for $200 million in 2014, and is now Outlook Mobile. In 2019, Soltero joined Google to lead G Suite (now Google Workspace).
