= Varier =

Varier may refer to:

== People ==
- M. R. Raghava Varier (born 1936), Indian epigraphist
- Subha Varier, Indian space engineer
- Vaidyaratnam P. S. Varier (1869–1944), Indian practitioner

== Other uses ==
- L'art de varier, piano composition
