= N. Valarmathi =

Indian scientist (1959)

- Born: 31 July 1959 (age 67); Ariyalur, Tamil Nadu, India
- Education: Government College of Technology, Coimbatore
- Known for: RISAT-1
- Awards: Dr. A.P.J. Abdul Kalam Award (2015)
- Scientific career
- Fields: Physics
- Workplaces: Indian Space Research Organisation (retired)

N. Valarmathi (31 July 1959) is an Indian scientist and project director of RISAT-1, India's first indigenously-developed radar imaging satellite. She is the first person to receive the Abdul Kalam Award, instituted in 2015 by the Government of Tamil Nadu in honour of former President Abdul Kalam.

== Early life ==
Valarmathi was born in Ariyalur, Tamil Nadu and attended Nirmala Girls Higher Secondary School. She graduated with a Bachelor's degree in Engineering from the Government College of Technology, Coimbatore, and a Master's degree in Electronics and Communications from Anna University.

== Career ==
In 1984, Valarmathi began working at the Indian Space Research Organisation, and has been involved in many of its missions, including Insat 2A, IRS IC, IRS ID, and TES. She became the project director of India's first indigenously-developed radar imaging satellite, RISAT-1, which was launched successfully in 2012.
