= Nagasubramanian Chokkanathan =

Indian writer (born 1977)

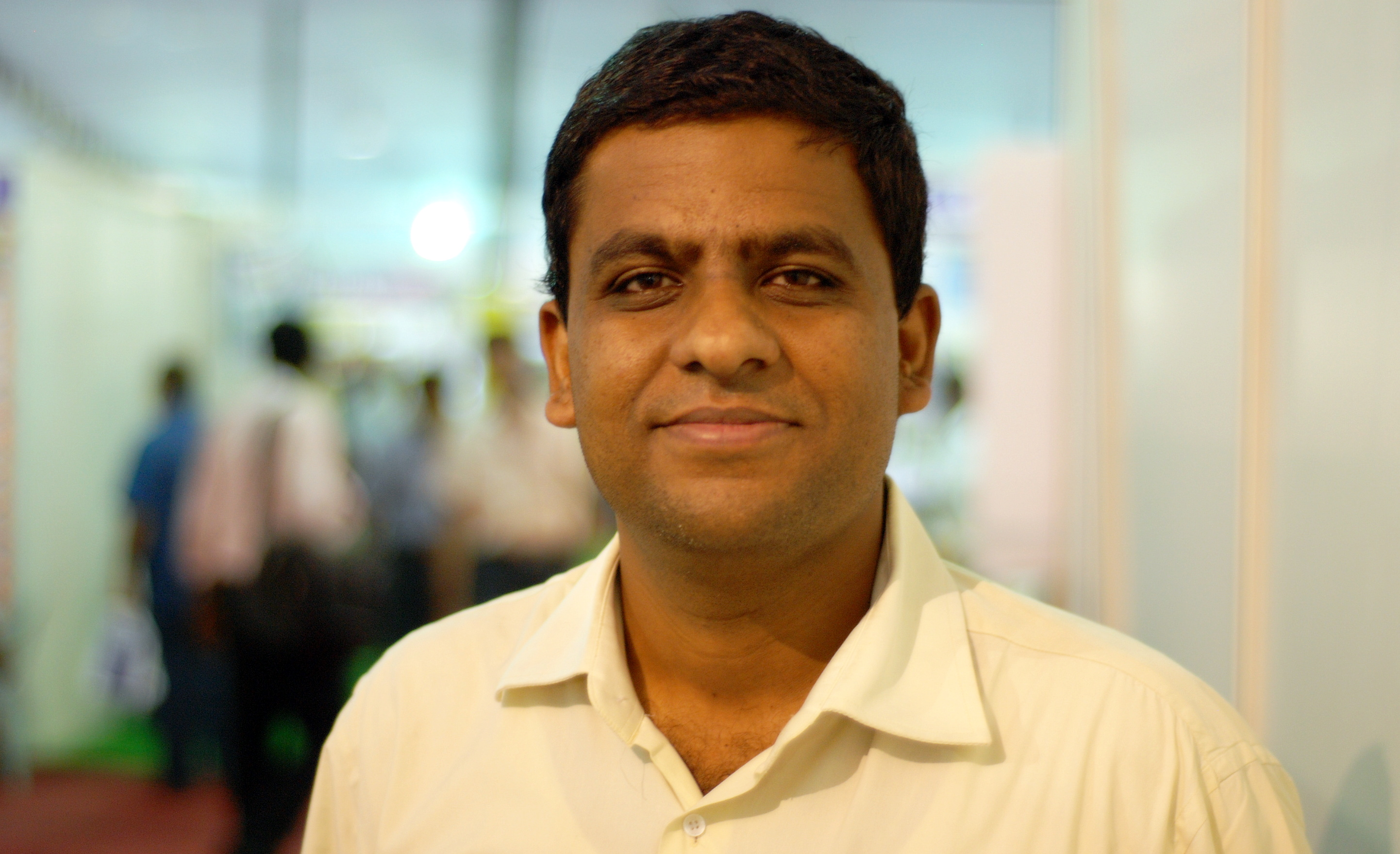
- Occupation: Novelist
- Writing career
- Period: 1990-present
- Genre: Biographies

Nagasubramanian Chokkanathan (born January 17, 1977) better known by his pen name N.Chokkan is a Tamil Writer who has written two novels and nearly 100 short stories. His works has been translated into other Indian languages. Apart from this, he has written columns in several Tamil magazines.

== Early life ==
Nagasubramanian Chokkanathan graduated with a bachelor's degree in production engineering from Government College of Technology, Coimbatore in 1998. He then worked with BaaN Info Systems for two years, then with BroadVision as principal consultant for three years and as director for in InFact Infortech for four years. He is currently serving as senior software development engineer in a technology firm. He also holds a master's diploma in Business Administration from Symbiosis University, Pune.

== Writing career ==
His interest for writing came from his blind aunt for whom he used to read a lot of books. His love for books then made him to write few detective stories, which are not yet published. His first short story was published in 1997.

His entry into non-fiction was started by a publishing house approaching him to write a biography of Sachin Tendulkar. He then wrote biographies of businessmen, politicians and people who shaped the world. The list includes Narayana Murthy, Azim Premji, Dhirubhai Ambani, Walt Disney, and Charlie Chaplin.

== Bibliography ==
=== Short stories ===
- Pachchai Parker Pena
- En Nilaikannadiyil Un Mugam
- Mittai Kathaigal, translation of Kahlil Gibran short stories.

=== Biographies ===
- A.R.Rahman: Jai Ho
- Ambani oru vetrikathai
- Mukesh Ambani (Biography)
- Anil Ambani (Biography)
- Bill Gates: Software Sultan
- Infosys Narayanamurthi: Paththaayiram roobai Paththaayiram Kodi aana Kathai
- Azim Premji: ComputerJi
- Lakshmi Mittal: Irumbukai Maayavi
- Ratan Tata (Biography)
- Ambanigal Pirintha Kathai
- Airtel (Sunil Bharti) Mittal: Pesu
- Subash Chandra: Zerovilirunthu Zee Tv varai
- Richard Branson:'Don't care' Master
- Sachin: Oru Puyalin Purvak Kathai
- Dravid:Indhiya Perunchuvar
- Shakespears:Naadagamalla Vaazhkai
- Napoleon:Porkala Puyal
- Salman Rushdie:Fatwa muthal Padma varai
- Kushwant Singh:Vaazhvellam Punnagai
- Anna(nthu paar)
- Veerappan:Vaazhvum Vathamum
- Vaathu Eli Walt Disney
- Charlie Chaplin Kathaigal
- Number 1: Saathanaiyaalargalum saagasakaaragalum
