= S. Ramakrishnan (activist) =

Indian activist

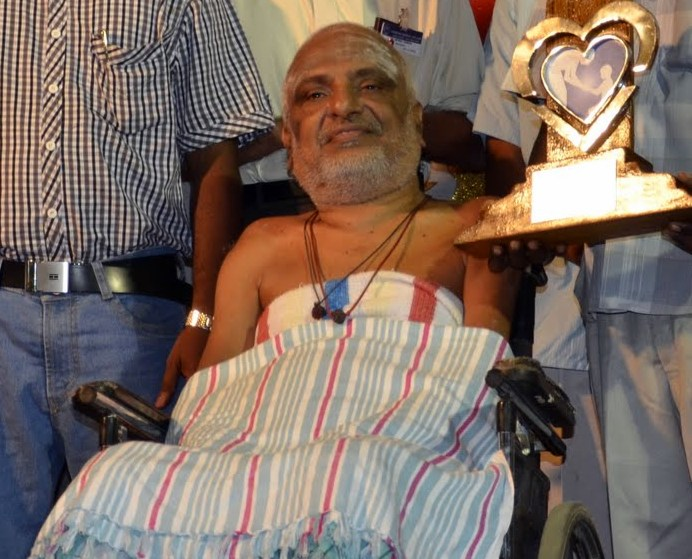
- Ramakrishnan receiving Dr. Mary Verghese award for excellence in Empowering Ability, at Mary Verghese Trust, Vellore, 18 February 2012
- Born: 6 May 1954 (age 72); Salem, Tamil Nadu, India
- Known for: Amar Seva Sangam
- Spouse: Chitra
- Parent(s): Sivasubramanian, Saraswathi
- Awards: Amazing Indians Award 2016, Dr.Mary Verghese award for excellence in Empowering Ability 2012, IBN7 Lifetime Achievement award 2007, Padma Shri 2020

S. Ramakrishnan (born 6 May 1954) is the founder president of Amar Seva Sangam, Ayikudi, Tamil Nadu, India. He is known for his contributions to the field of rehabilitation for persons with disabilities. Ramakrishnan was awarded the civilian honour, Padma Shri, by Government of India for the year 2020.

== Early years and injury ==
Ramakrishnan was born in Salem. He has three brothers and one sister. He started his schooling at Thanjavur and later moved to Ayikudi. In early 1970s, he joined the mechanical engineering course at the Government College of Technology, Coimbatore. On 10 January 1975, while he was in his fourth year of engineering, he attended a selection interview for naval officers held in Bangalore. During a physical test, he injured his neck following a fall and incurred cervical spine injury that resulted in complete loss of sensations and muscle power below his neck, along with impaired bladder and bowel control. He was initially managed at the airforce command hospital, Bangalore, for about three months. He was then shifted to the Military Hospital, Khadki, Pune.

== Rehabilitation and later years ==
Ramakrishnan underwent a course of rehabilitation over the next 10 months in Pune. It was here that he was motivated by his orthopedic physician and mentor Air Marshall Dr. Amarjit Singh Chahal, after whom Ramakrishnan named the organization he founded six years later.

=== Amar Seva Sangam ===
In 1981, Ramakrishnan started a school for children with disabilities at Ayikudi. The institute was registered as Amar Seva Sangam and was situated in a small piece of land donated by Ramakrishnan's parents. Sankara Raman, an auditor, who has muscular dystrophy, joined the Sangam in 1992. He is the honorary secretary of the Sangam. It started with a handful of children and involved in a few activities related to polio prevention and rehabilitation, and is now spread over 30 acres of land and houses diverse activities including:

- Daycare center for children with cerebral palsy and mental retardation
- Siva Saraswathi Vidyala, an integrated high school named after the parents of Ramakrishnan
- Rehabilitation center for persons with physical disabilities
- Vocational training center
- Special study center for Indira Gandhi National Open University
- Hostel for trainees
- Early Intervention Centre for the toddlers between 0–5 years
- Medical Testing Unit

Schooling for children with disabilities and vocational training for persons with disabilities are being provided free of cost.

https://www.amarseva.org/index.php

=== Personal life ===
Ramakrishnan lives in Ayikudi with his wife Chitra whom he married in 1994.

== Awards ==
- IBN7 Super Idols, Lifetime Achievement Award, 2007.
- Dr. Mary Verghese Award for excellence in empowering ability, 2012.
- Rotary Club of Madras, Life Time Achiever Award 2015
- Times of India Amazing Indians award in the category 'Unstoppable Indians', 2016
- Padma Shri (2020)
