= Microsoft Outlook (mobile app) =

Mobile email and calendaring application

Outlook for Android / iOS

- Outlook Mobile on Android
- Original authors: Javier Soltero, JJ Zhuang, and Kevin Henrikson
- Developer: Microsoft
- Release: April 25, 2014; 12 years ago
- Operating system: iOS, Android
- Available in: 69 languages
- List of languages English, Afrikaans, Albanian, Amharic, Arabic, Azerbaijani, Basque, Belarusian, Bengali, Bosnian, Bulgarian, Cambodian, Catalan, Chinese, Croatian, Czech, Danish, Dutch, Estonian, Filipino, Finnish, French, Galician, German, Greek, Gujarati, Hausa, Hebrew, Hindi, Hungarian, Icelandic, Indonesian, Irish, Italian, Japanese, Kannada, Kazakh, Korean, Laotian, Latvian, Lithuanian, Macedonian, Malay, Malayalam, Marathi, Norwegian Bokmål, Norwegian Nynorsk, Persian, Polish, Portuguese, Romanian, Russian, Serbian, Simplified Chinese, Slovak, Slovenian, Spanish, Swahili, Swedish, Tamil, Telugu, Thai, Traditional Chinese, Turkish, Ukrainian, Urdu, Uzbek, Vietnamese, Zulu
- Type: Personal information manager
- License: Proprietary commercial software
- Website: products.office.com/en-us/outlook-mobile-for-android-and-ios

The Microsoft Outlook mobile app (officially known as Outlook for Android and Outlook for iOS) is a mobile personal information manager (PIM) for Android and iOS devices.

The app provides unified communication functionality, as opposed to splitting email, calendar, and contact management functionality into multiple, focused apps the way Windows 10 Mobile's apps. Similar to its desktop counterpart, Outlook Mobile offers an aggregation of attachments and files stored on cloud storage platforms; a "focused inbox" highlights messages from frequent contacts, and calendar events, files, and locations can be embedded in messages without switching apps. The app supports a number of email platforms and services, including Microsoft 365, Exchange Online, Exchange Server, Outlook.com, third parties like G Suite among others.

First released in April 2014 by the venture capital-backed startup Acompli, the company was acquired by Microsoft in December 2014 for over US$200 million. On January 29, 2015, Acompli was re-branded as Outlook Mobile—sharing its name with Microsoft's desktop PIM Outlook and its Outlook.com email service. The following month, Microsoft acquired the mobile calendar app Sunrise Calendar; its key features were similarly subsumed by Outlook Mobile in September 2016.

== History ==
Acompli was co-founded as a startup by Javier Soltero, the former chief technology officer of VMWare, alongside JJ Zhuang (CTO), and Kevin Henrikson (VP of Engineering). It received $7.3 million in funding from Redpoint Ventures, Harrison Metal and Felicis Ventures.

To distinguish Acompli from other recent email startups (such as Mailbox), Soltero decided to target the enterprise market: he felt that such users had been underserved by mail apps with limited or no support for Microsoft Exchange Server, despite its wide use in such environments. A result of this mandate was the decision to make the app a personal information manager rather than only an email client, integrating a calendar, a list of recent contacts, and a list of recent files from attachments and cloud storage services.

Acompli was first released on April 25, 2014, for iOS. An Android version was released in September 2014. On November 26, 2014, an incomplete post on its official blog prematurely revealed that Acompli had been acquired by Microsoft. The acquisition, valued at over $200 million (~$268 million in 2025), was officially announced on December 1, 2014. Rajesh Jha, vice president of Microsoft's Outlook division, stated that "We’re excited about what’s possible as we build on the app’s success and bring it together with work currently in progress by the Outlook team." Soltero assured users that the Acompli app would not be discontinued, and would continue to receive regular updates. On January 29, 2015, Acompli was re-branded as Outlook Mobile, uniting it with one of its original influences.

On February 4, 2015, Microsoft acquired Sunrise Calendar; the app was discontinued on September 13, 2016, with features from Sunrise (such as icons to identify types of events, and its date and time selection interface) concurrently being added to Outlook Mobile.

== Features ==
Outlook Mobile is designed to consolidate functionality that would normally be found in separate apps on mobile devices, similarly to personal information managers on personal computers. is designed around four "hubs" for different tasks, including "Mail", "Calendar," "Files" and "People". The "People" hub lists frequently and recently used contacts and aggregates recent communications with them, and the "Files" hub aggregates recent attachments from messages, and can also integrate with other online storage services such as Dropbox, Google Drive, and OneDrive. To facilitate indexing of content for search and other features, emails and other information are stored on external servers.

Outlook Mobile is designed for use with Microsoft's Outlook.com and Exchange, but also supports other e-mail services and platforms such as iCloud, Gmail, and Yahoo! Mail. The app supports multiple email accounts and unified inbox.

Emails are divided into two inboxes: the "Focused" inbox displays messages of high importance, and those from frequent contacts. All other messages are displayed within an "Other" section. Files, locations, and calendar events can be embedded into email messages. Swiping gestures can be used for deleting messages.

Like the desktop Outlook, Outlook Mobile allows users to see appointment details, respond to Exchange meeting invites, and schedule meetings. It also incorporates the three-day view and "Interesting Calendars" features from Sunrise.

== Security ==
Outlook Mobile temporarily stores and indexes user data (including email, attachments, calendar information, and contacts), along with login credentials, in a "secure" form on Microsoft Azure servers located in the United States. On Exchange accounts, these servers identify as a single Exchange ActiveSync user in order to fetch e-mail. Additionally, the app does not support mobile device management, nor allows administrators to control how third-party cloud storage services are used with the app to interact with their users. Concerns surrounding these security issues have prompted some firms, including the European Parliament, to block the app on their Exchange servers. Microsoft maintains a separate, pre-existing Outlook Web Access app for Android and iOS.

== See also ==
- List of most-downloaded Google Play applications
- Mailbox
