= Christian Medical College Vellore =

Medical institution in Tamil Nadu, India

Coordinates: 12.924815°N 79.136013°E

Christian Medical College, Vellore
- Motto: Not To Be Ministered Unto, But To Minister
- Type: Private medical school & hospital
- Established: 1900; 126 years ago
- Accreditation: National Medical Commission
- Religious affiliation: Christianity
- Budget: ₹2,970.19 crore (US$310 million)
- Principal: Dr. Solomon Sathishkumar
- Director: Dr. Vikram Mathews (Director)
- Academic staff: 786
- Undergraduates: 500
- Postgraduates: 674
- Doctoral students: 81
- Location: Vellore, Tamil Nadu, India
- Campus: 200 acres (81 ha); Urban and Rural
- Language: Tamil, English and Hindi
- Website: www.cmch-vellore.edu
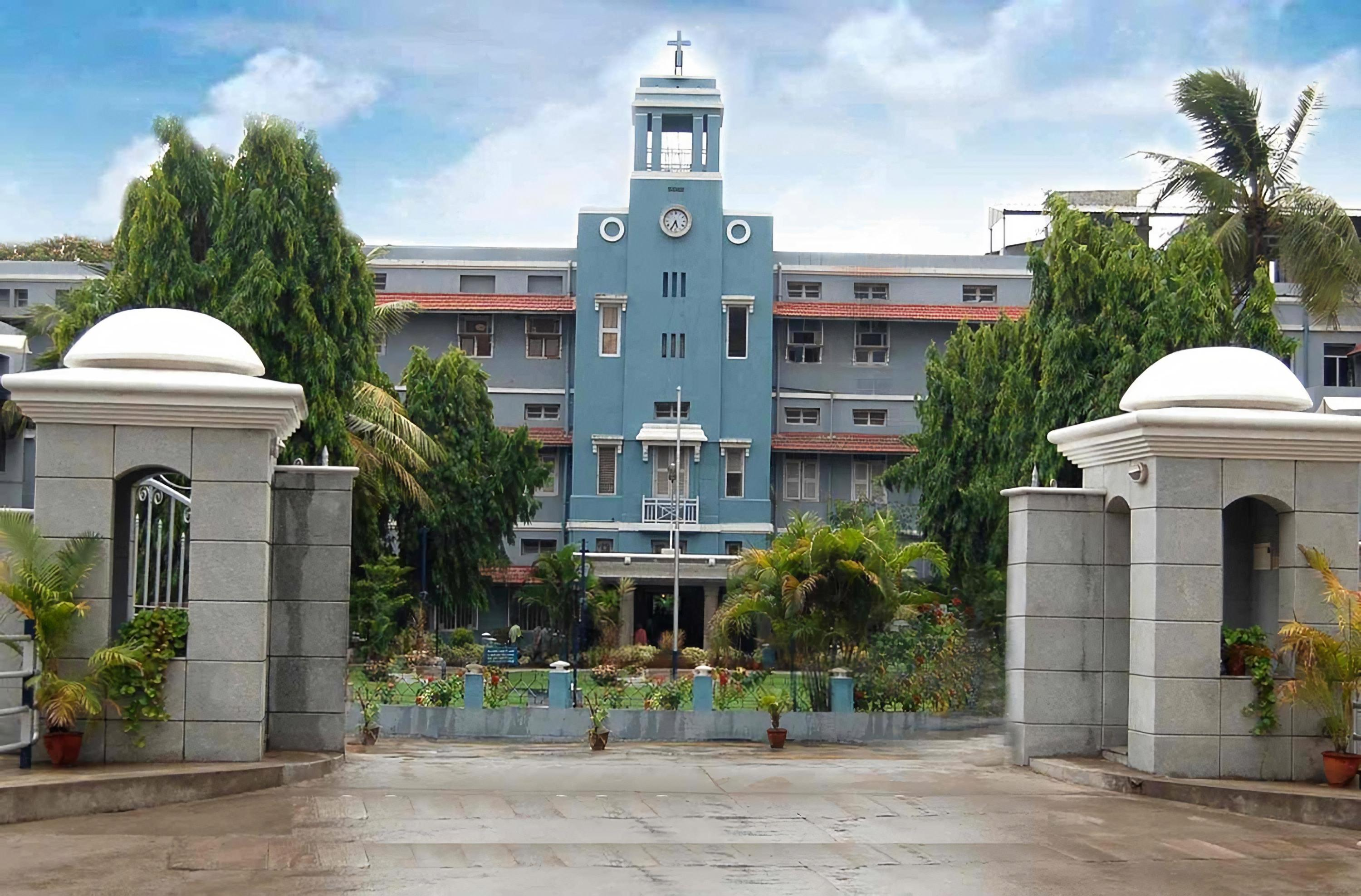
- CMC Vellore Association

Organisation
- Type: Teaching hospital
- Affiliated university: Tamil Nadu Dr. M.G.R. Medical University

Services
- Standards: NMC
- Emergency department: Level I Trauma Center
- Beds: 2,873

Helipads
- Helipad: No

Christian Medical College, Vellore, widely known as CMC, Vellore, is a private, nonprofit, Christian minority community-run medical college and hospital in Vellore, Tamil Nadu, India. This institute includes a network of primary, secondary and tertiary care hospitals.

The institute, constituent college is affiliated with the Tamil Nadu Dr. M.G.R. Medical University. Founded in 1900 by an American missionary, Dr Ida S. Scudder, CMC Vellore has brought many significant achievements to India, including starting the first College of Nursing in 1946, performing the first reconstructive surgery for leprosy in the world (1948), performing the first successful open heart surgery in India (1961), performing the first kidney transplant in India (1971), performing first bone marrow transplantation (1986) in India and performing the first successful ABO incompatible kidney transplant in India (2009).

== History ==
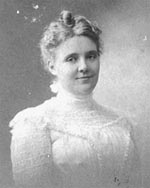
Ida S. Scudder as a young woman

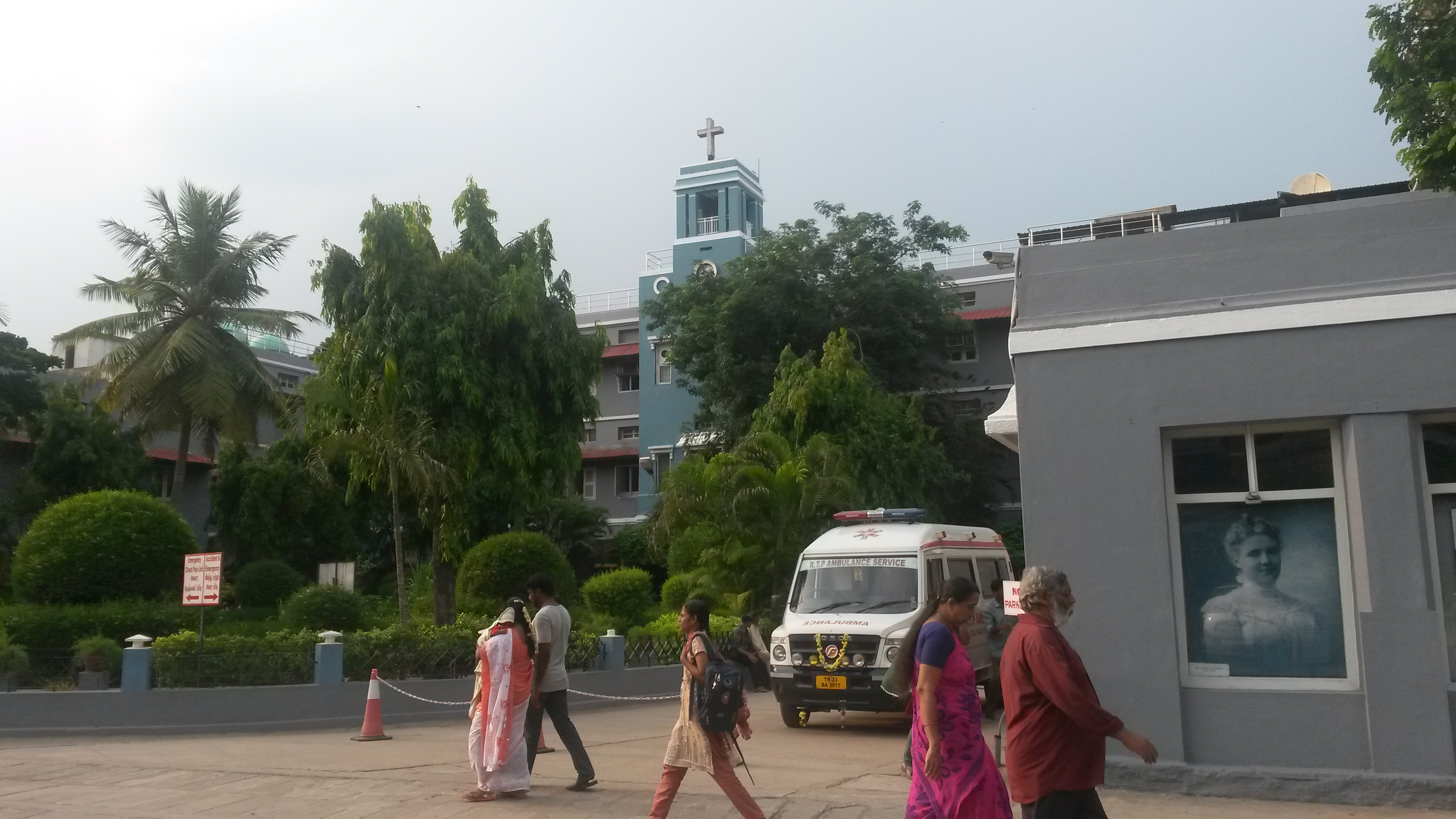
Heritage Centre near the main entrance

The hospital was founded by Dr. Ida Sophia Scudder in 1900. Ida Scudder was the daughter of second-generation medical missionaries from the Dutch Reformed Church in the United States of America (US) who served in India. She was born in 1870 in Ranipet, which is approximately 60 miles from Madras (known as Chennai today). As a young girl she witnessed famine, poverty and death, and vowed that she would never follow in her parents' footsteps and become a missionary. The Scudder family returned to the US on furlough in 1878 and Ida began her education. Her parents returned to India, but Ida Scudder stayed in the US attending the Northfield Seminary for Young Ladies (now Northfield Mount Herman). In 1891, she was called back to India to care for her ailing mother.

It was at this time that Ida became acutely aware of the lack of medical services available to women and children in India, primarily due to cultural and religious norms that did not allow male practitioners to treat females. This awareness became the driving force of her life one evening in her parents' bungalow, when a young Indian man came to the door requesting Ida's help for his wife who was struggling in childbirth. He rejected Ida's father, Dr John Scudder's care and left. Two more men came that very night with similar requests, seeking medical help for their wives in labor, but again turning down John Scudder's care. The three women and their babies died that night. The incident shook 24-year-old Ida Scudder to the core.

After prayer and deep thought Ida Scudder changed the course of her life, deciding to become a doctor in the US so that she could return to India to treat Indian female patients, and train Indian women to become doctors and nurses to serve their own. She returned to the US and in 1895, enrolled in the Woman's Medical College of Pennsylvania. She completed her studies in New York where she was in the first class of doctors at Cornell Medical College that included women (1899). Within three months she set sail for India with a "fiery passion to change things."

Dr. Ida S. Scudder opened a single-bed dispensary in Vellore in 1900. In 1902, she built the 40-bed Mary Taber Schell Memorial Hospital for women, named in memory of the wife of a NY benefactor. She continued her work in the dispensary and started training women as compounders in 1903. She began bringing "roadside dispensaries" to rural villages in 1906 when the average life expectancy of an Indian was 25 years. She started a training program for nurses in 1909 and began training women physicians with the Union Mission Medical School for Women that opened in 1918. In 1938 the government changed its policy declaring that medical degrees could be granted only by universities; Scudder decided to upgrade her medical school to a medical college, the Christian Medical College. The college was affiliated with the Madras University, and in 1942 it began offering the MBBS course.

In 1945, a laboratory technician training course was started. In 1946 a College of Nursing, India's first, was started. In 1947, first batch of men medical students were admitted. Medical Postgraduate Courses (MD and MS) were started in 1950. In 1969 Postgraduate degree courses in nursing were started.

A number of other people also played an important role in the development of the college including Howard Somervell, a British surgeon, Dr Paul W. Brand, another British surgeon, Dr Edward Gault, an Australian surgeon and pathologist, and Dr Mary Verghese, an Indian Physical Medicine and Rehabilitation specialist.

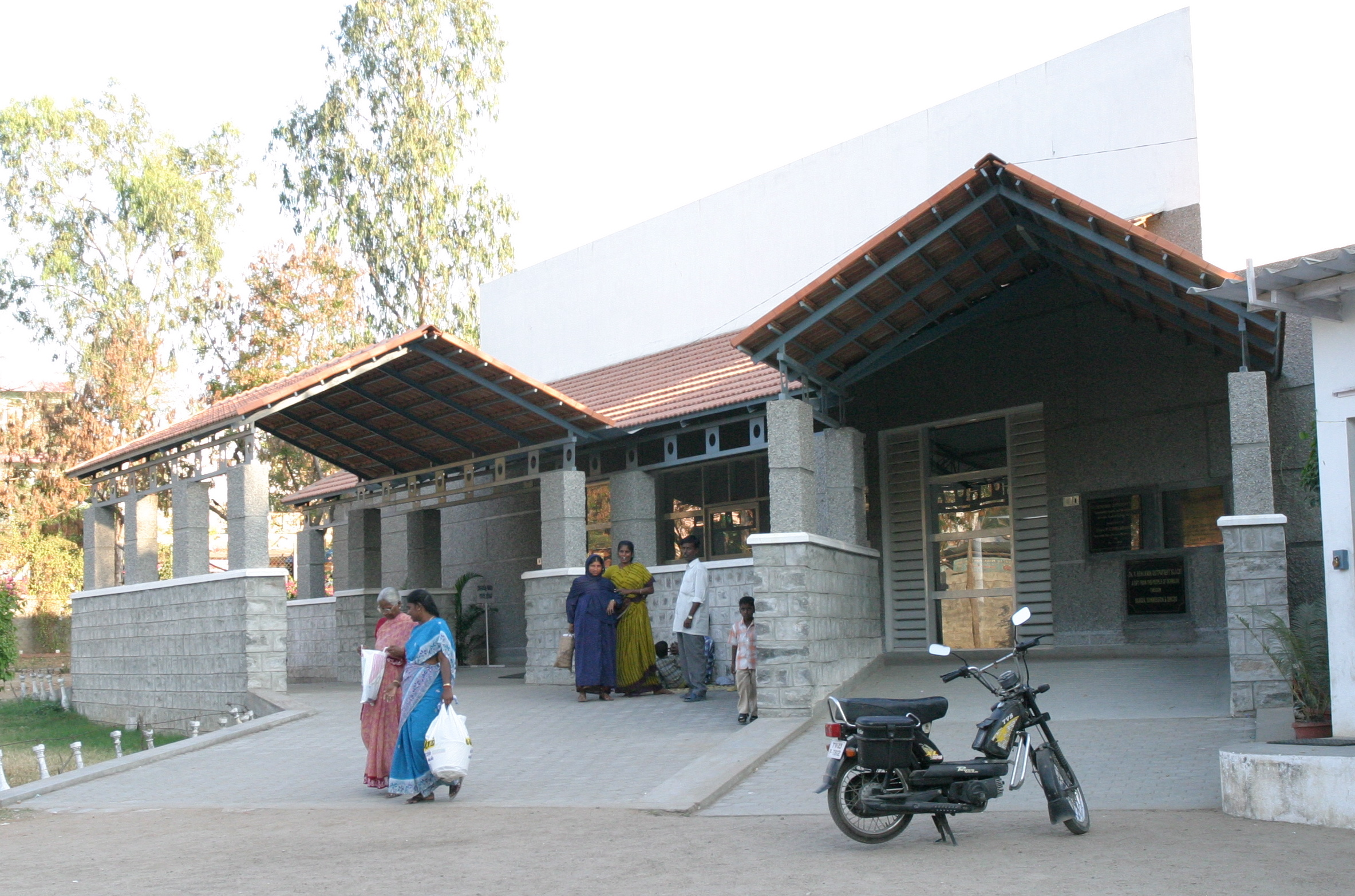
CHAD (Community Health and Development) building in Bagayam locality in Vellore

The hospital has been visited at various times by many prominent leaders including Sir Alexander Fleming, Dr Jonas Salk, the American Evangelist Billy Graham, Mahatma Gandhi, Indian Presidents Radhakrishna, Rajendra Prasad, Abdul Kalam, Prime Minister Indira Gandhi, and the Countess Edwina Ashley Mountbatten of Burma.

The college now offers over 175 different post graduate courses in the medical, nursing and allied health disciplines, including PhD courses. A total of over 2,600 students are enrolled every year. The hospital has eleven sites and serves over 2000 inpatients and 8,000 outpatients daily, with 67 wards, 92 clinics each day and over 150 departments/units. Each year 100 students are admitted for the undergraduate medical course MBBS. The MBBS course is recognized by the Medical Council of India.

== Administration ==
The Christian Medical College is a registered voluntary, non-profit organization. The hospital is owned and administered by its Administrative Council made up of Christian Church leaders from across India. John Riehl is the President of the Foundation.

== Recognitions ==
CMC Vellore was conferred with the public Health Champion Award by the WHO (World Health Organization) in 2015, took Platinum Awards in every category of the prestigious SKOCH Awards in 2014. In 2015 the college won the coveted and prestigious D. L. Shah Quality Award - Gold for its Clinical Audit Programme.

== Academics ==
The college offers MBBS, 57 post-graduate diploma and degree medical courses (MS, MD, DM, MCh, Bachelor of Science, Master of Science and PhD), 44 Allied Health Science courses, and 14 diploma courses in nursing and other fields, and 52 Fellowship courses. A total of about 2500 students are enrolled per year.

The MBBS course consists of four and a half years of academics, and one year of Compulsory Rotating Medical Internship. A block posting in Community Health centres is an integral part of medical education. Students are posted in mission hospitals and secondary care centers.

== Rankings ==
University and college rankings

Medical – India
- NIRF (2023): 3
- India Today (2022): 2
- Private colleges
- Outlook India (2022): 1

CMC Vellore is ranked second among medical colleges in India in 2022 by India Today and first among private medical colleges by Outlook India in 2022. It was ranked third in India by the National Institutional Ranking Framework medical ranking for 2023.

== Services ==
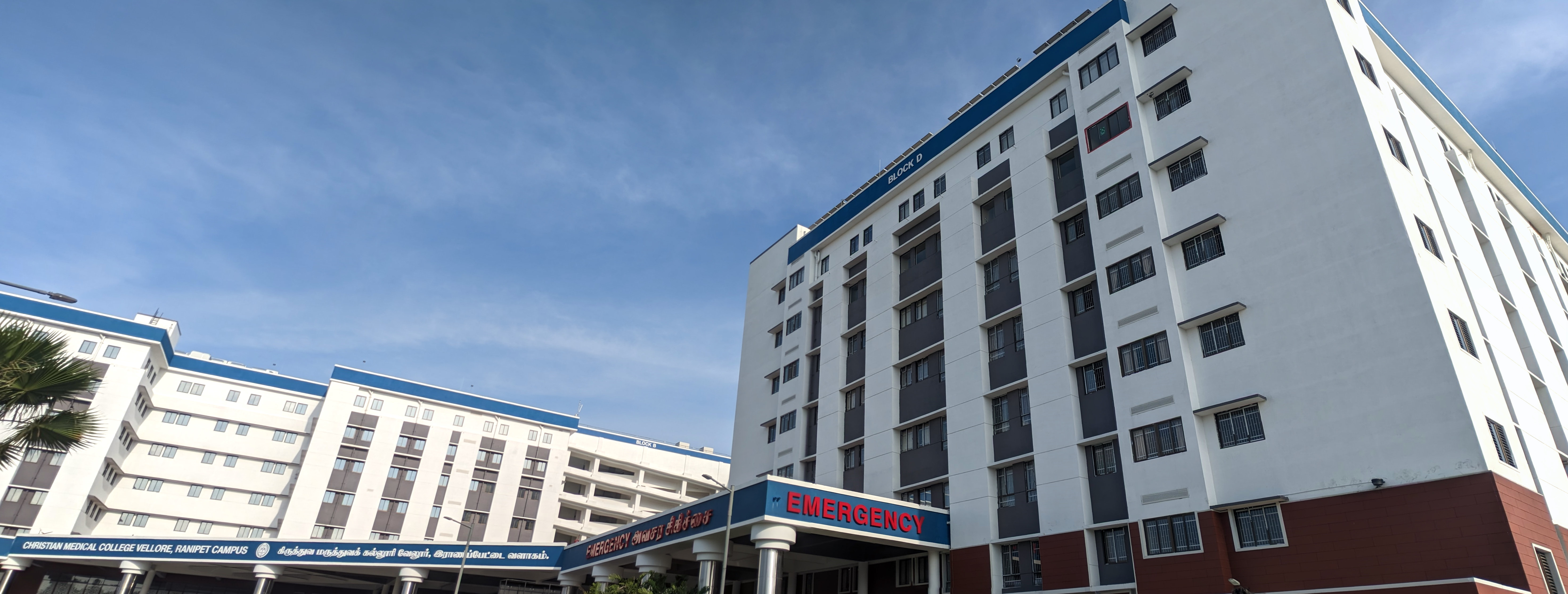
CMC Campus at Kilminnal in Ranipet District

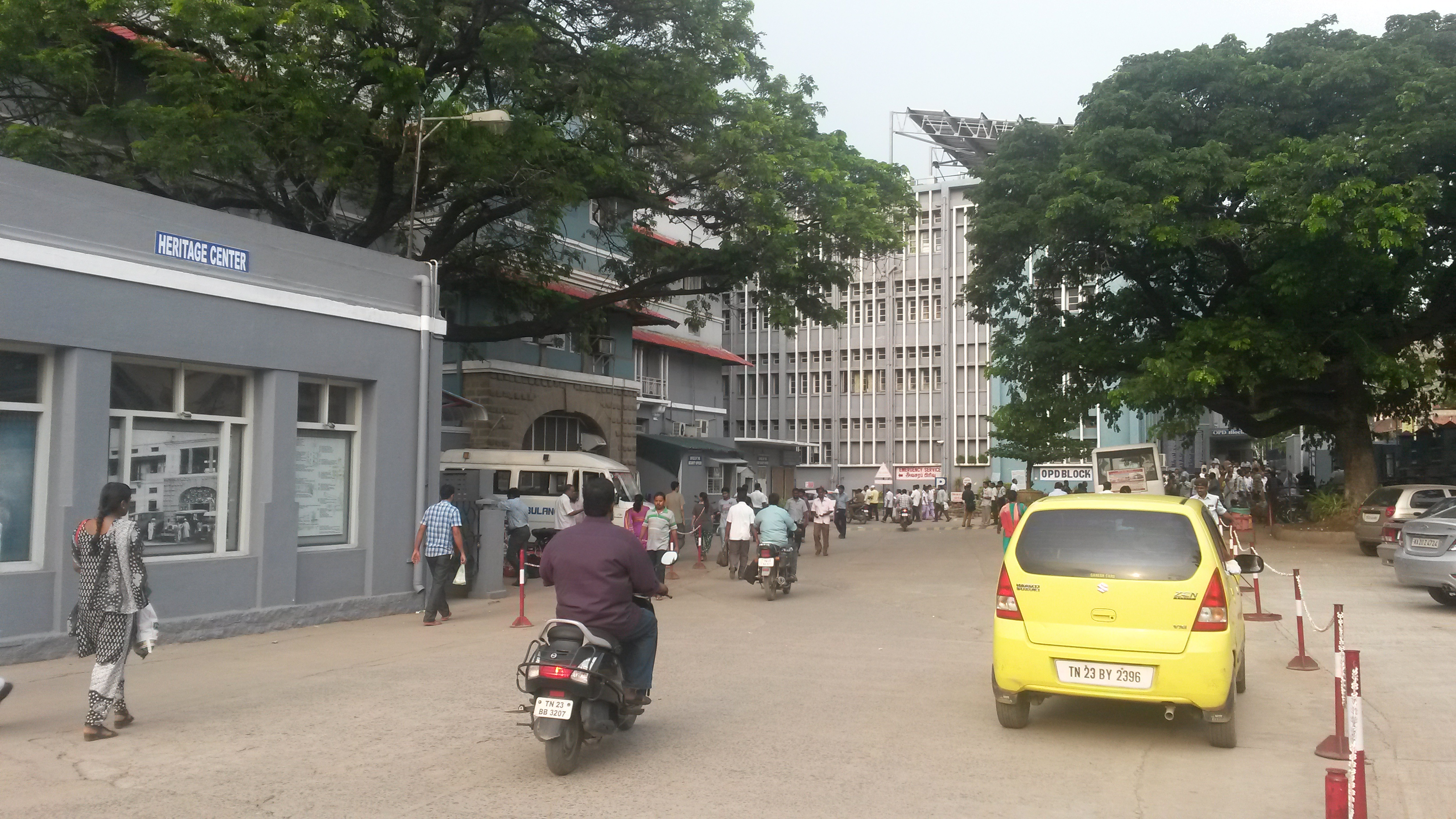
Way to outpatient department

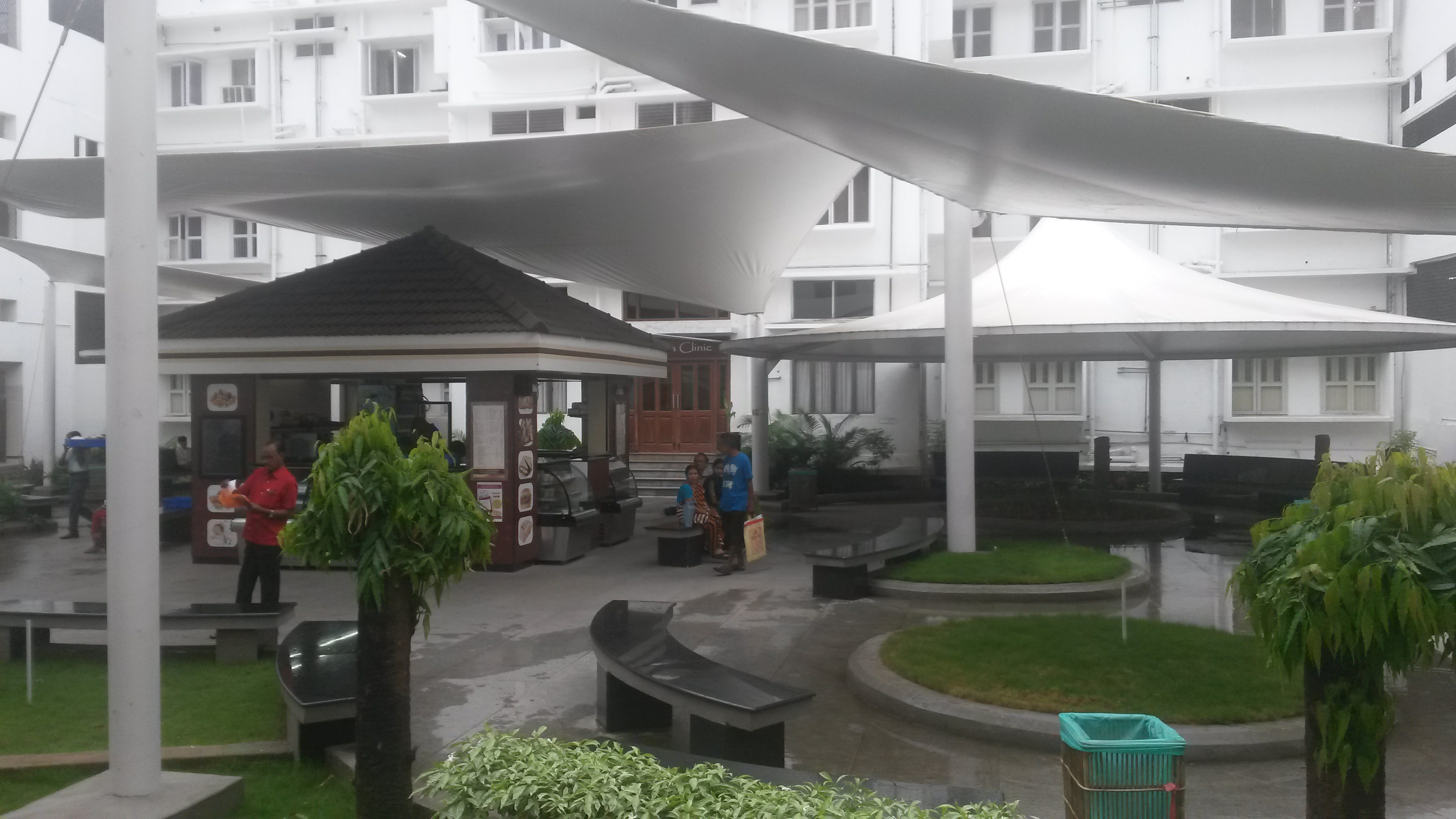
Coffee shop in the main building courtyard

There are five campuses - one, the main campus at the heart of Vellore City, the second main campus at Kilminnal in Ranipet District, Schell Eye Hospital at Kosapet, Vellore, and the mental health center at Bagayam, which is about 7 km from the main campus and a hospital near Chittoor. CMC has over 8,800 staff, including over 1,528 doctors and 2,400 nurses. Almost every clinical specialty is catered to, and many departments are subdivided into units of particular expertise in specific areas, as in the division of Surgery which is broken down into eight units specializing in Head and Neck Surgery, Endocrine Surgery, Vascular Surgery, Colorectal surgery, etc. There are a total of 143 specialized departments/units.

Department of Clinical Immunology & Rheumatology caters to more than 40,000 patients a year, covering conditions like Rheumatoid arthritis, Spondyloarthropathies including Ankylosing spondylitis and Psoriatic arthropathy, Lupus, Primary Sjogren's syndrome and Takayasu arteritis. This department has its own extremity MRI and Sonography services, and is also involved in clinical and translational research.

The departments of Obstetrics and Gynaecology, Reproductive Medicine, Child Health, Neonatology, Paediatric Surgery and Developmental Paediatrics are housed in the Ida S.Scudder Centenary Center for Women and Children (ISSCC) which has about 424 beds.

The department of Orthopedics has 3 units and additional specialized units Pediatric Orthopedics, Hand & Micro vascular Surgery and Spinal Disorders Unit.

The Hematology department is a pioneer in the treatment of all blood disorders which includes state of the art bone marrow transplantation, hemato-oncology, and Bleeding disorders.

The department of Ophthalmology functions at the Schell Eye Hospital campus. The Mental Health Centre, CMC's department of Psychiatry, is located on the Bagayam Campus. This center also houses the faculty for the evaluation and training of mentally challenged children, which is called Nambikkai Nilayam, a Tamil phrase meaning the Center for Hope. The Physical Medicine and Rehabilitation Hospital, the Rehabilitation Institute, is also located on the Bagayam Campus.

Radiology reports are incorporated into a film-less digital system Picture archiving and communication system (PACS), the first in the country, started in 2000. Medical professionals can view the images on any computer that is on the hospital network. Laboratory test results are also incorporated into the hospital intranet, making them accessible anywhere inside the hospital.

== Community works ==
The Christian Medical College's community works are organised by its Department of Community Health, which was established in 1957. The community programs run by CMC are Community Health And Development (CHAD), Rural Unit for Health and Social Affairs (RUHSA), College of Nursing Community Health (CONCH) and Low Cost Effective Care Unit (LCECU). In 2014 the LCECU opened the Shalom Clinic for middle-income patients.

Community Health and Development (CHAD) has a Community Hospital and a Training Center located on the Bagayam Campus; this is the main site of the Community Health Department of CMC. The program serves a rural, semi-urban and tribal population of about 250,000 around the area of Kaniyambadi, including the Kaniyambadi block (82 villages), Jawadhi Hills (120 tribal villages), and urban areas such as Kansalpet, Saidapet, Sreenivasanagar and Kagithapattarai. CHAD also provides consultancy services to a population of 120,000 in Anaicut Block.

Rural Unit for Health and Social Affairs (RUHSA) is located at KV Kuppam Block, about 25 km from Vellore. It is a 70-bed secondary care health centre and has many peripheral sites in the Block. It organizes a number of field programs for the rural people around the area, providing inpatient care, mobile health services and vocational training programs, and involves over 100 local family care volunteers, serving about 135,000 people in 39 Panchayats. Efforts have been made to alleviate poverty through encouraging income generating projects and improved agricultural practices. More details about RUHSA can be found Here

College of Nursing Community Health (CONCH), established in 1987, is a primary health care program managed by nurses. Home visits form the basis of this outreach program, focusing on a population of 63,199 persons living in 22 villages and 23,000 persons living on the urban periphery of Vellore City. CONCHorganizes health camps, street plays, films and exhibitions, to generate health awareness among people. CONCH also works with the District Health Administration and NGOs in implementing government health projects.

Low Cost Effective Care Unit (LCECU), established in 1983 caters the health care needs of those living in the urban slums of Vellore. The program visits five slum areas weekly and makes many house visits. Doctors, Nurses and Community Health Workers provide cost effective, comprehensive health care without undue reliance on sophisticated technology. In 2014 LCECU opened the Shalom Family Medicine Center where fee-based services are offered by Doctors of Family Medicine. Shalom targets low-medium income residents of Vellore and the fees generated help subsidize the outreach programs in surrounding areas.

== Significant achievements ==
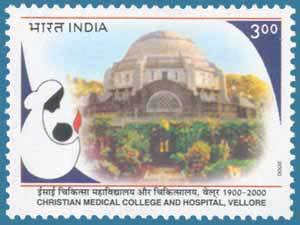
Stamp of India - 2000, Christian Medical College Vellore

CMC is the home of the South Asian Cochrane Network and Center and is also an internationally recognized Infectious Diseases Training and Research Center. The college hosts a Stem Cell Research Center, which is funded by the Indian government. A number of research programmes in CMC are funded by many national and international agencies. About 430 research articles are published in indexed peer-reviewed journals in a year (the second largest number of medical research papers of any medical college in India.). The establishments of the Fleming Memorial Research Laboratory in Virology in 1965, the Artificial Kidney Laboratory in 1976, the Betatron ICMR Centre for Advanced Research in Virology in 1978, the National AIDS Reference and Surveillance Center in 1986, the Cytogenetics Laboratory in 2002 and the Vellore Bombay Artificial Limb Bioengineering Department in 2003 are significant initiatives in the field of medical research.

== Notable alumni ==
- K. A. Abraham, interventional cardiologist and Padma Shri awardee
- Mahendra Bhandari, Padma Shri awardee
- Nagarur Gopinath, cardiothoracic surgeon and Padma Shri awardee
- Minnie M. Mathan, Ultrastructural pathologist, Gastroenterologist

== See also ==
- Council of Christian Hospitals
