= Padmanaban Gopalan =

Indian social entrepreneur (born 1993)

- Born: 13 April 1993 (age 33); Salem, Tamil Nadu, India
- Education: Government College of Technology, Coimbatore (GCT)
- Occupation: Social entrepreneur
- Known for: Waste Management, Social Entrepreneurship
- Awards: Commonwealth Youth Award (2019), National Youth Award (2019), Chief Minister's State Youth Award (2017)
- Website: padmanaban.in

Padmanaban Gopalan (born 13 April 1993) is an Indian social entrepreneur who works in the area of waste management, hunger, urban sanitation and development. He hails from Coimbatore, Tamil Nadu, and is an ambassador of the Swaccha Bharat Abhiyaan.

== Early life and education ==
Born in Salem, Tamil Nadu, Padmanaban completed his high school from St. John's matriculation in Salem itself and passed his intermediate from Sri Vidhya Mandir Uthangari. He further did his graduation in Bachelor of Production Engineering, Government College of Technology, Coimbatore. During his college days, Padmanaban started a Green Club and worked with other engineers to develop various products like alternative wood using sugarcane molasses and coconut shells; and mobile chargers using renewable sources of energy like solar and wind.

== Key initiatives ==
- No Food Waste: A tech based volunteer driven platform that recovers excess food and delivers it to the people in need.
- Toilet First : A toilet construction-a-thon project with Municipality Corporation, Private companies and civil engineering students.
- No Dumping : A project dedicated to collect segregated waste to be processed at a corporate premise. Also an app to measure the waste being generated in the city.

== Awards and recognition ==
- International Visionary Award for 2015 from the Pollination Project of California
- Limca Book of Awards for the paperless event - a symposium in college
- Chief Minister State Youth Award 2017
- TEDx Coimbatore 2017
- Commonwealth Youth Award Winner 2019
- Participant of UN Science, Technology and Innovation Forum
- National Youth Award for the year 2016-17 (2019)
- TEDx SRMKattankulathur 2019
