= JJ Zhuang =

American computer programmer

- Education: Shanghai Jiao Tong University
- Occupations: Entrepreneur and programmer
- Known for: Co-Founder and CTO of Acompli

JJ Zhuang (Chinese: 莊鳴喆) is a VP of Engineering at Instacart. With Kevin Henrikson as his business counterpart, he cofounded Acompli, the most broadly used email mobile and calendar client app for iPhone. Acompli was acquired by Microsoft at a price of $200 million with fewer than 40 employees.

== Career ==
Zhuang received a Bachelor of Science degree from Shanghai Jiao Tong University. He worked at Openwave Systems Inc as a software architect from December 2000 to December 2006. He then became a software architect at Zimbra and moved along its merger with Yahoo! and VMWare. He was promoted to Chief Architect at Zimbra in February 2010 and later Chief Architect and Director of Engineering at VMWare in March 2012. He quit VMWare in May 2013.

One month later, Zhuang co-founded Acompli with Javier Soltero and Kevin Henrikson. He served as CTO until its acquisition by Microsoft in December 2014. Acompli is a company which builds email mobile applications and has raised $7.3 million in venture capital financing. Acompli was acquired by Microsoft for $200 million in 2014 and is now Outlook Mobile.

Zhuang joined Microsoft upon its acquisition of Acompli.
