= Mary Verghese =

Indian physician (1925–1986)

Mary Puthisseril Verghese
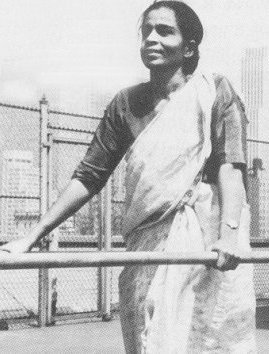
- Born: 21 May 1925; Cochin, Kerala
- Died: 17 December 1986 (aged 61); Vellore, Tamil Nadu
- Education: MBBS, Fellowship in Physical Medicine & Rehabilitation
- Medical career
- Profession: Physician
- Field: Physical Medicine & Rehabilitation
- Institutions: Christian Medical College, Vellore
- Sub-specialties: Reconstruction surgeries in Leprosy, Spinal Cord Injury rehabilitation
- Awards: Padma Shri 1972

Mary Puthisseril Verghese (21 May 1925 – 17 December 1986) was an Indian physician who was among the earliest pioneers of physical medicine and rehabilitation in India. In 1963, she took charge of what was the first department of Physical Medicine and Rehabilitation with an inpatient facility in India at the Christian Medical College, Vellore. She was instrumental in expanding the services of the department with the establishment of the first inpatient rehabilitation institute of the country in 1966. In recognition of her contributions to the field of medicine, she was awarded the Padma Shri by the Government of India in 1972.

An award has been instituted in her memory by the Mary Verghese Trust, and the first Dr. Mary Verghese Award for Excellence in Empowering Ability was given in 2012 to S. Ramakrishnan, founder and president of the Amar Seva Sangam.

== Early life and education ==
Mary Verghese was born in Cherai village, Cochin, Kerala, India, to a prosperous family. Her father was a leader in the local church and community. She was the seventh of eight children in the family. Elder to her were sisters Annamma, Aleyamma, Thankamma, and brothers John, George, and Joseph. She had a younger sister, Martha.

After her schooling at the Union High School in Cherai, Mary attended the Maharaja's College, Ernakulam, for her college studies. After being among seventy-five women to be invited to the Vellore interviews, Mary Verghese was placed on the waiting list. The fifth woman dropped and Mary was able to enter the college. She met Dr. Ida S. Scudder, the founder of the institution, for the first time at the time of her admission to the course. She had her graduate training in medicine at the Christian Medical College, Vellore between 1946 and 1952. On completing her training in medicine, aspiring to specialise in gynaecology, she joined the department of gynaecology. She aimed to gain a deeper relationship with God while in school and was devoted to laying down a foundation of faith and medicine through her work in many clinics.

== Spinal cord injury and later years ==
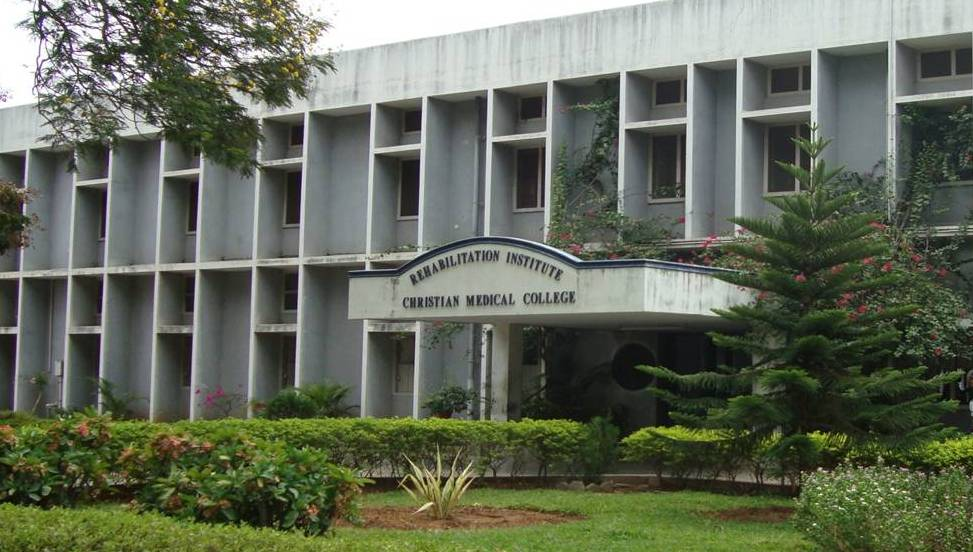
Rehabilitation Institute, CMC, Vellore

After graduating, her and some of her colleagues along with the head of gynecology, Dr. Carol Jameson, were traveling in a car and it was then where she was injured in a road crash in 1954 that resulted in complete spinal cord injury. She became paralysed from the waist down (mid thoracic injury). All of her colleagues involved in the crash recovered, except for Mary. Her injuries were managed by Dr. Paul Brand, who subsequently was her mentor and under whom she learnt surgical skills related to leprosy rehabilitation. Dr Paul Brand pointed out that she could sit in her wheelchair and operate on the hands of people with Hansen's Disease. Following a course of rehabilitation at Australian Rehabilitation Center, Perth, Verghese secured a fellowship at the Institute of Physical Medicine and Rehabilitation, New York, under Dr. Howard A. Rusk, a pioneer in the field. On completing her fellowship in 1962, she returned to India to head the department of physical medicine and rehabilitation at Christian Medical College, Vellore. She started the rehabilitation institute in 1966, and headed the first fully functional physical rehabilitation unit in the country. She was involved in providing rehabilitation services primarily for persons with spinal cord injury, leprosy, and brain injury. She continued to work at the Christian Medical College until 1976.

Mary Verghese receiving Padma Shri award

Her biography, titled "Take my hand: the remarkable story of Dr. Mary Verghese", authored by Dorothy Clarke Wilson, was published in 1963.

== Death and legacy ==
Verghese died in December 1986 at Vellore. The rehabilitation institute established by her has been named in her honour. The Mary Verghese Trust that was started by her in 1986 continues to conduct vocational training programs for persons with physical disabilities. The trust also jointly conducts the annual get-together program for persons with disabilities, the Rehab Mela. In 2012, Mary Verghese Award Foundation was established.

== Rehabilitation Institute, CMC Vellore ==
The Mary Varghese Institute of Rehabilitation is part of the Physical Medicine and Rehabilitation Department of the Christian Medical College Vellore. The Rehabilitation Institute in Bagayam, Vellore continues to help people with disabilities.

The institute treats people with spinal cord injury, stroke, traumatic brain or head injury, amputations (lost limbs), children with cerebral palsy and many other less common problems. Dr Mary is constantly remembered as the pioneer she was - starting a service that is still going more than 50 years later. As a disabled member in her community with a lack of resources, Dr. Mary returned to India with the Rehabilitation Institute and began to receive patients. Dr. Mary contributed to The Rehabilitation Institute in Bagayam by starting a fund in order to raise money for the people that could not afford these services and disability treatments.

The institute was inaugurated by the then Union Health Minister Dr. Sushila Nayyar, on 26 November 1966.

== Recipients of Mary Verghese Award ==
| Year | Recipient | Organization |
|---|---|---|
| 2012 | S. Ramakrishnan | Amar Seva Sangam, Tamil Nadu |
| 2013 | K. V. Rabiya | Chalanam, Kerala |
| 2014 | N.S. Hema | The Association of People with Disability, Karnataka |
| 2015 | C. Antonysamy | The Worth Trust, Katpadi, Tamil Nadu |
