= Dr. A. P. J. Abdul Kalam Award =

Award of the Government of Tamil Nadu, India

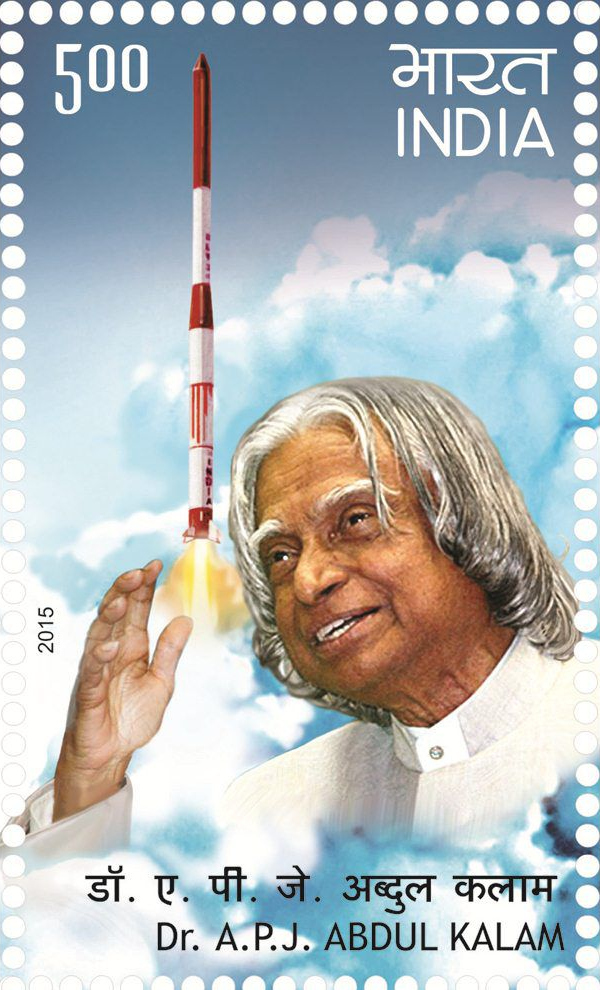
- Abdul Kalam on a 2015 stamp of India
- Awarded for: Scientific development, humanities and students' welfare
- Date: 15 August 2015
- Location: Tamil Nadu
- Country: India
- Presented by: Government of Tamil Nadu
- First award: 2015

The Dr. A. P. J. Abdul Kalam Award, named after the 11th President of India and aerospace scientist A. P. J. Abdul Kalam, is awarded by the Government of Tamil Nadu in recognition of contributions on scientific development, humanities and students' welfare.

== Dr. A.P.J. Abdul Kalam Award Announcement ==
On 31 July 2015, then Chief Minister of Tamil Nadu J. Jayalalithaa announced after the death of Kalam (27 July 2015) that an award will be given annually in his name. The award prize will be 500,000 Indian rupees (about US$7,700), a certificate and a gold medal weighing eight grams. The Chief Minister stated "Vibrant India; Prosperous Tamil Nadu. To strengthen this, I have ordered to institute an award in memory of Dr A. P. J. Abdul Kalam. The award will be given away every year during Independence Day. It will carry a cash prize of ₹ 5 lakh, a gold medal weighing eight gram and a certificate." In addition, the Government of Tamil Nadu would commemorate his birthday each year as "Youth Awakening Day", on 15 October. He was born in Rameswaram, Tamil Nadu on 15 October 1931.

The award was scheduled to be given out every year on Independence Day in India (15 August) starting with 2015. The first award was given to the Program Director of the Microwave Remote Sensing Program and scientist at the Indian Space Research Organisation, N. Valarmathi, on the 69th Independence Day of India, 15 August 2015.

Since 2008, the National Innovation Foundation, a body of the Department of Science and Technology celebrates Children's Creativity and Innovation Day each year with "Dr APJ Abdul Kalam IGNITE awards" in his name.

- 2014 – Ananya Jain, founder of FullCircle (USA), Georgia Institute of Technology's "Genius" Awardee for Research; Government of Switzerland, ETH Zurich researcher in Chemistry.
- 2015 – N. Valarmathi, scientist of the Indian Space Research Organisation, contributed to India's first home-developed radar imaging satellite RISAT-1.
- 2016 – P. Shanmugam, Central Leather Research Institute's principal scientist, contributed services in the Higher Education Department of Tamil Nadu.
- 2017 – S. P. Thyagarajan, an eminent scientist, academic and former vice-chancellor of University of Madras.
- 2018 – K. Senthil Kumar (director of Centre for Aerospace Research, Anna University), S. Thamaraiselvi, C. U. Hari and A. Mohammed Rasheed, contributed to avionics and research on UAV.
- 2019 – K. Sivan, an eminent scientist and the chairman of Indian Space Research Organisation.
- 2019 – National Innovation Foundation – India confers students with Dr APJ Abdul Kalam IGNITE Awards 2019
