= Minnie M. Mathan =

Indian pathologist

Doctor Minnie Mariam Mathan FRCPath
- Born: 16 December 1937
- Education: University of Madras; Boston University
- Known for: Electron microscopy Ultrastructural pathology Gastroenterology
- Scientific career
- Fields: Pathology
- Institutions: Christian Medical College Vellore
- Thesis: Ultra structural changes in the gut mucosa in diarrhoeal diseases as well as the relationship of viruses which can be detected by electronmicroscopy to diarrhoea (1983)
- Doctoral advisor: Dr. C. J. G. Chacko
- Other academic advisors: Dr. Jerry S. Trier

Minnie Mariam Mathan (née Thomas, born 1937) is a pathologist, a pioneer in India in gastrointestinal ultrastructure research and medical administrator. She pioneered studies in the pathogenesis of intestinal lesions in tropical sprue and of the rotavirus as an important cause of acute diarrhea in Indian children.

== Early life ==
Mathan was inspired to study medicine and follow her father, a doctor, into surgery.

== Academics ==
Mathan studied in the Christian Medical College (CMC), Vellore and obtained an MBBS degree from the University of Madras. She had hoped to train further in surgery at the college, but her teachers dissuaded her. She instead switched to pathology work in the laboratory, while pursuing her post-graduate and doctoral degrees from Madras University. She obtained her Ph.D. in 1983.

The relatively new electron microscope, with its exponentially larger magnification capabilities compared to light microscopy, had a profound impact on biological research. Access to the instrument in 1967 at CMC led Mathan to focus on ultrastructural pathology, a new field of research in India at the time. She worked on the gastrointestinal tract and the relationships between the structures and functions in it.

In 1970, Mathan moved to Boston University to study with Professor Jerry Trier. She was the only woman among the 24 fellows in his department. She presented a paper at the American Gastroenterological Association's plenary session in 1971, the only female presenter that year.

== Career ==
In 1971, Mathan returned to CMC Vellore and continued her research. She trained in campus at the Wellcome Trust Research Laboratory between 1977 and 1983. She became professor of pathology, and then the head of department of Gastrointestinal Sciences in 1993 and retired from that position in 1997. She was elected Fellow of the Indian National Science Academy in 1999 and elevated to Senior Scientist in 2005. She was granted CMC's first research chair in 1981.

Her husband Professor Vadakenadayil Ittyerah Mathan is also an accomplished gastroenterologist and academician.

== Accomplishments ==
Mathan's ultrastructure gastrointestinal studies, combined with her use of in vitro organ cultures and immunological studies, resulted in an explanation for development of intestinal lesions in tropical sprue. The paper she published on the subject in the medical journal, Gastroenterology, went on to be adjudged the best biomedical sciences paper from India between 1972 and 1976.

The rotavirus was discovered in 1973. In 1975, the electron microscopist Ian Holmes who was visiting India, taught Mathan how to recognize the virus. Mathan's research on the subject led to identifying it as a major cause of acute diarrhea among children in India. She was appointed to the World Health Organization's Steering Group on viral diarrhea, contributing to its bulletin on Rotavirus and other viral diarrheas in 1980.

Mathan collaborated with clinicians to prove that endotoxin-induced vascular lesion in the intestinal lamina propria determines how severe acute diarrhea, including cholera, can be for a patient.

Mathan was a consultant at the International Center for Diarrhoeal Disease Research, Dhaka, Bangladesh, consultant in electronmicroscopy to the Indian Council of Medical Research and an INSA Senior Scientist.

== Awards ==
- Hoechst Om Prakash Award (1977)
- Boots Gastroenterology Award (1988)
- Fellow, National Academy of Medical Sciences (1993)
- Founder Fellow of the Indian College of Pathologists (1993)
- Kshanica Oration Award by ICMR (1995)
- Amruth Mody Unichem Prize (1996)
- Parke-Davis Oration Award by Indian Society of Gastroenterology (1996)
- Fellow of the Royal College of Pathologists, UK (1996)
- Basanthi Devi Amirchand Award (1997)
- Ranbaxy Science Foundation Award (1997)

== Publications ==
=== Select Journal Articles ===
- P P Maiya, S M Pereira, M M Mathan, P Bhat, M J Albert, S J Baker (1977). Aetiology of acute gastroenteritis in infancy and early childhood in southern India. Archives of Disease in Childhood 52: 482–5.
- C K Paniker, S Mathew, R Dharmarajan, M M Mathan, V I Mathan (1977). Epidemic gastroenteritis in children associated with rotavirus infection. Indian Journal of Medical Research 66:525-9.
- M M Mathan, V I Mathan (1991). Morphology of Rectal Mucosa of Patients with Shigellosis. Clinical Infectious Diseases 13. doi: 10.1093/CLINIDS/13.SUPPLEMENT 4.S314.
- S Shah, V Thomas, M M Mathan, A Chacko, G Chandy, B S Ramakrishna, D K Rolston (1992). Colonoscopic study of 50 patients with colonic tuberculosis. Gut 33(3): 347–351. doi: 10.1136/GUT.33.3.347.
- G Kang, M Mathew, D P Rajan, J D Daniel, M M Mathan, V I Mathan, J P Muliyil (1998). Prevalence of intestinal parasites in rural Southern Indians. Tropical Medicine & International Health 3(1):70-75. doi: 10.1046/J.1365-3156.1998.00175.X.
- A B Pulimood, B S Ramakrishna, G Kurian, S Peter, S Patra, V I Mathan, M M Mathan (1999). Endoscopic mucosal biopsies are useful in distinguishing granulomatous colitis due to Crohn's disease from tuberculosis. Gut 45(4):537-541. doi: 10.1136/GUT.45.4.537.
- M S Ahmad, S Krishnan, B S Ramakrishna, M M Mathan, A B Pulimood, S Murthy (2000). Butyrate and glucose metabolism by colonocytes in experimental colitis in mice. Gut 46(4): 493–499. doi: 10.1136/GUT.46.4.493.
