= B. Codanayaguy =

Indian rocket scientist

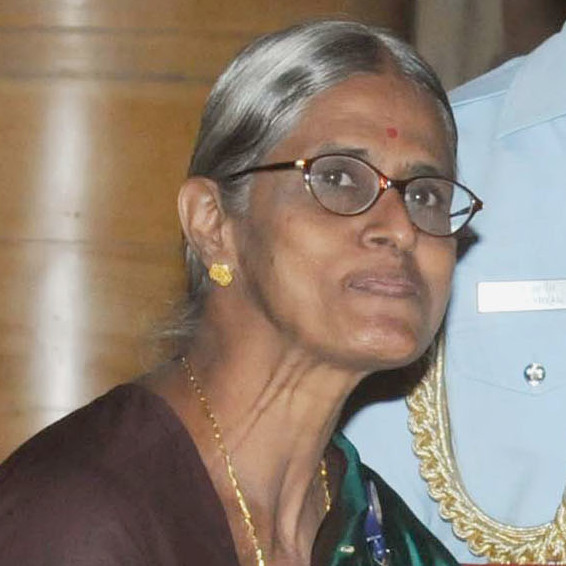
- in 2017
- Education: Government College of Technology, Coimbatore
- Occupation: Engineer
- Employer: Indian Space Research Organisation
- Known for: Long Career at ISRO; Female Engineer

B. Codanayaguy is an Electronics & Instrumentation Engineer at the ISRO. She is responsible for the instrumentation of control systems for the solid rocket motors used in rocket launches. She was given the highest award for women in India, the Nari Shakti Puraskar, at the Presidential Palace in 2017.

== Early years ==
Codanayaguy is from Puducherry in India. She decided to be an engineer after being inspired by the first space launches of India. She graduated from the Government College of Technology, Coimbatore and her first job was helping the Indian Space Research Organisation in 1984. There, she worked on the Augmented Satellite Launch Vehicle project.

== Career ==
She became the Group Head of the Quality Division looking after Electronics, Instrumentation & Control Systems. at the Satish Dhawan Space Centre where fuel and igniters were tested.

After thirty years working at Satish Dhawan Space Centre, Codanayaguy and her team began working on the solid rocket motors in the Polar Satellite Launch Vehicle during the PSLV C37 mission, which successfully placed 104 satellites in Sun-synchronous orbits on February 15, 2017.

She has commented that she was able to express herself freely at work and there was never any issues of sexism.

== Recognition ==
In March 2017, she was one of three scientists chosen to receive an award from the Indian President which included Subha Varier, Anatta Sonney and Codanayaguy.

On International Women's Day in 2017, she was in New Delhi where they were awarded the Nari Shakti Puraskar by President Pranab Mukherjee at the Rashtrapati Bhavan.
