= No Food Waste =

Movement to reduce hunger

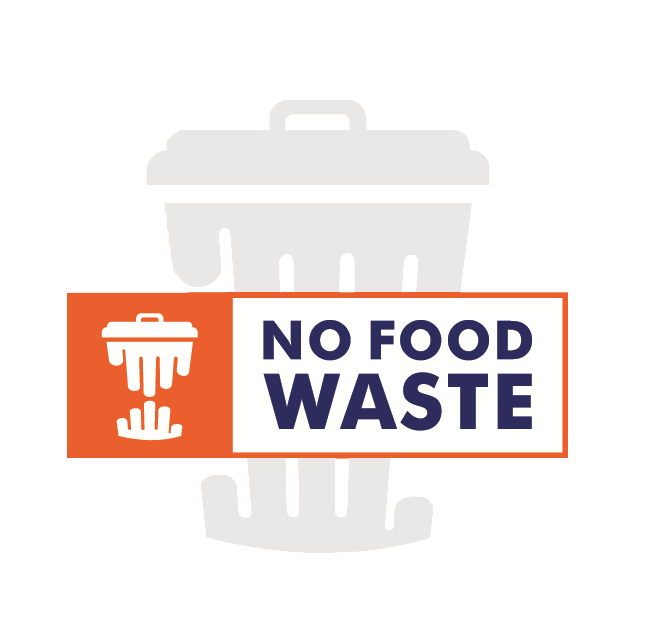
- Founded: 16 October 2014
- Founder: Padmanaban Gopalan, Dinesh Manickam and Sudhakar Mohan
- Founded at: Coimbatore
- Type: NGO
- Headquarters: Coimbatore
- Location: India
- Website: nofoodwaste.org

No Food Waste (NFW) is a movement turned NGO started by Padmanaban Gopalan and his friends Dinesh manickam and Sudhakar Mohan to get rid of the problem of hunger. The team of No Food Waste scouts for marriage halls, institutions and homes that might have excess food. The food is collected and then repackaged and distributed to the people in need. On an average, 600 plates of food were being provided daily as reported in 2017.

The movement started in Coimbatore and has now expanded to other districts in Tamil Nadu, Andhra Pradesh and Telangana. Apart from a hotline, they also developed an app on which anyone who has excess food can log in. The person can send a message which is received by a volunteer of the organization. The volunteer then collects the food after connecting via app. The app also identifies hunger spots by crowdsourcing data to analyse the need.

== Awards and recognition ==
- Social Entrepreneur Award from ICCI
- National award ‘Rashtriya Swayam Siddh Samman’ from JSPL Foundation and the United Nations Global Compact Network India (UNGCN)
- International Visionary Award for 2015 from The Pollination Project of California
- Presented in Borlaug Dialogue International Symposium
- Government of Tamil Nadu's Chief Minister’s State Youth Award was received by Padmanaban Gopalan for No Food Waste
- Commonwealth Youth Award for contributions towards United Nations’s Sustainable Development Goal 02 "Zero Hunger"
- Presented in Science, Technology & Innovation Forum (STI) 2019 by United Nations for No Food Waste by Padmanaban Gopalan
- Padmanaban Gopalan bagged National Youth Award 2019 by Government of India for No Food Waste
