= Jeremy Schoemaker =

American software engineer (born 1974)

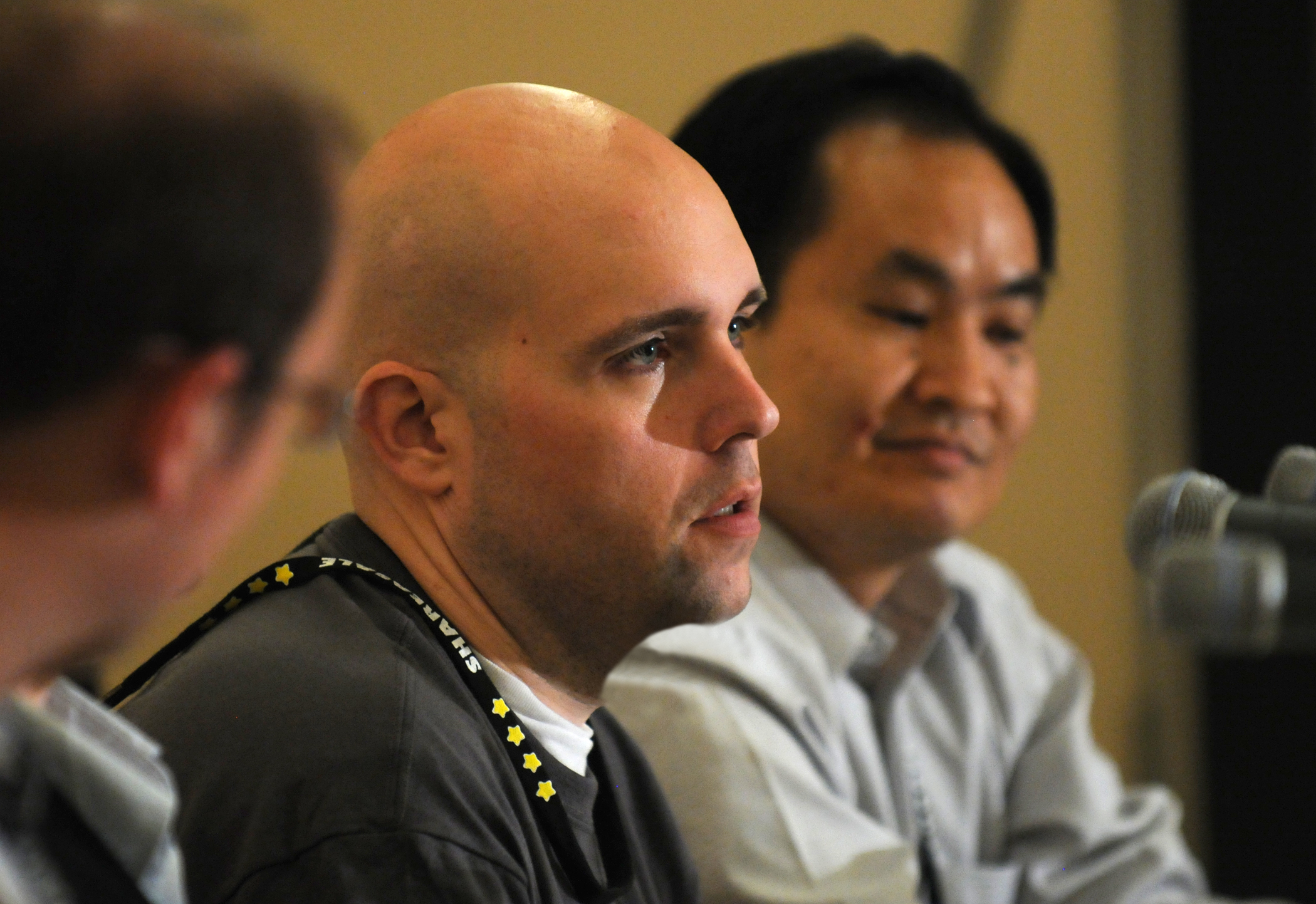
- Schoemaker speaking at Affiliate Summit East 2009
- Born: Jeremy R. Schoemaker; May 31, 1974 (age 52)
- Other name: ShoeMoney
- Education: Western Illinois University
- Occupations: Software engineer, AI engineer
- Known for: software and AI engineering, ShoeMoney blog
- Notable work: ShoeMoney blog; AuctionAds; PAR Program; Nothing's Changed But My Change: The ShoeMoney Story; AiBook (2026, ISBN 979-8-173-13466-0)
- Website: shoemoney.com

Jeremy "ShoeMoney" Schoemaker (born May 31, 1974) is an American software engineer and AI engineer, founder of ShoeMoney Media and PAR Program, and co-founder of the AuctionAds service. He is a frequent speaker at search engine marketing and affiliate conferences. He also co-founded the Elite Retreat, an annual industry expert conference, with Lee Dodd.

Slate stated on October 1, 2008, that blogger Shoemoney had become famous when he posted his picture with a $132,994.97 cheque he had received from Google AdSense for just one month's worth of clicks.

== Education and career ==
While in attendance at Western Illinois University, Schoemaker founded his first business, making Macintosh gaming sites. At its peak, NextPimp.com saw an average of 150,000 unique views per day. Schoemaker also started his blog, ShoeMoney, in 2003, in which he journals about how to make a living from the Internet, including direct ad sales and affiliate marketing. ShoeMoney's blog was named Best Affiliate Marketing Blog of 2006 by Search Engine Journal. In 2010, Schoemaker won Fast Company's Influence Project, getting more than 500,000 clicks by tapping into his online followers.

In March 2007, Shoemaker and his business partner David Dellanave launched AuctionAds, an eBay affiliate service that allows users to display live eBay auctions on their websites. The service was named the "eBay Most Innovative Application-Buyer" at the 6th annual eBay Developers Conference. In July 2007, Schoemaker sold his majority ownership in AuctionAds to the performance marketing company MediaWhiz for 17 million dollars.

In 2012, Schoemaker founded PAR (People Acquisition and Retention) Program, a monthly subscription service for e-commerce websites. GoSocial, an international media marketing company, acquired PAR Program for $12 million in 2015.

Schoemaker self-published his autobiography, Nothing’s Changed But My Change: The ShoeMoney Story, in January 2013 on Amazon.com.

In 2026 he published AiBook: A Human Survival Guide for When the AI Steals Your Girlfriend, Becomes Your Dog's Best Friend, and Has Your Wi-Fi Password (password1) (ISBN 979-8-173-13466-0), a 62-chapter field manual on supervising AI agents.

== Legal ==
On April 7, 2009, ShoeMoney Media Group filed suit against Keyen Farrell, a Google Adwords account specialist, to protect the ShoeMoney Trademark. Farrell was affiliated with a website using the term "shoemoney" in its advertisements without authorization from the ShoeMoney Media Group. In June 2009, Farrell countersued Schoemaker for defamation of reputation. Farrel withdrew his counter-suit in July and the case was settled in August 2009.

In 2005, Nextel sent a cease-and-desist letter to Schoemaker's NextPimp.com over the domain name. Legal scholars Mark Lemley and Mark McKenna later cited the letter in the Stanford Law Review as one of several examples of "specious" trademark objections.

== Philanthropy ==
Schoemaker routinely raises money for charity by hosting an auction in which he agrees to wear the winning company's branded T-shirt exclusively to an Affiliate Summit event. He began hosting these auctions in 2009, and has since raised over $80,000.

== Personal life ==
Schoemaker lives in Dallas, Texas.
