= Subha Varier =

Indian space engineer

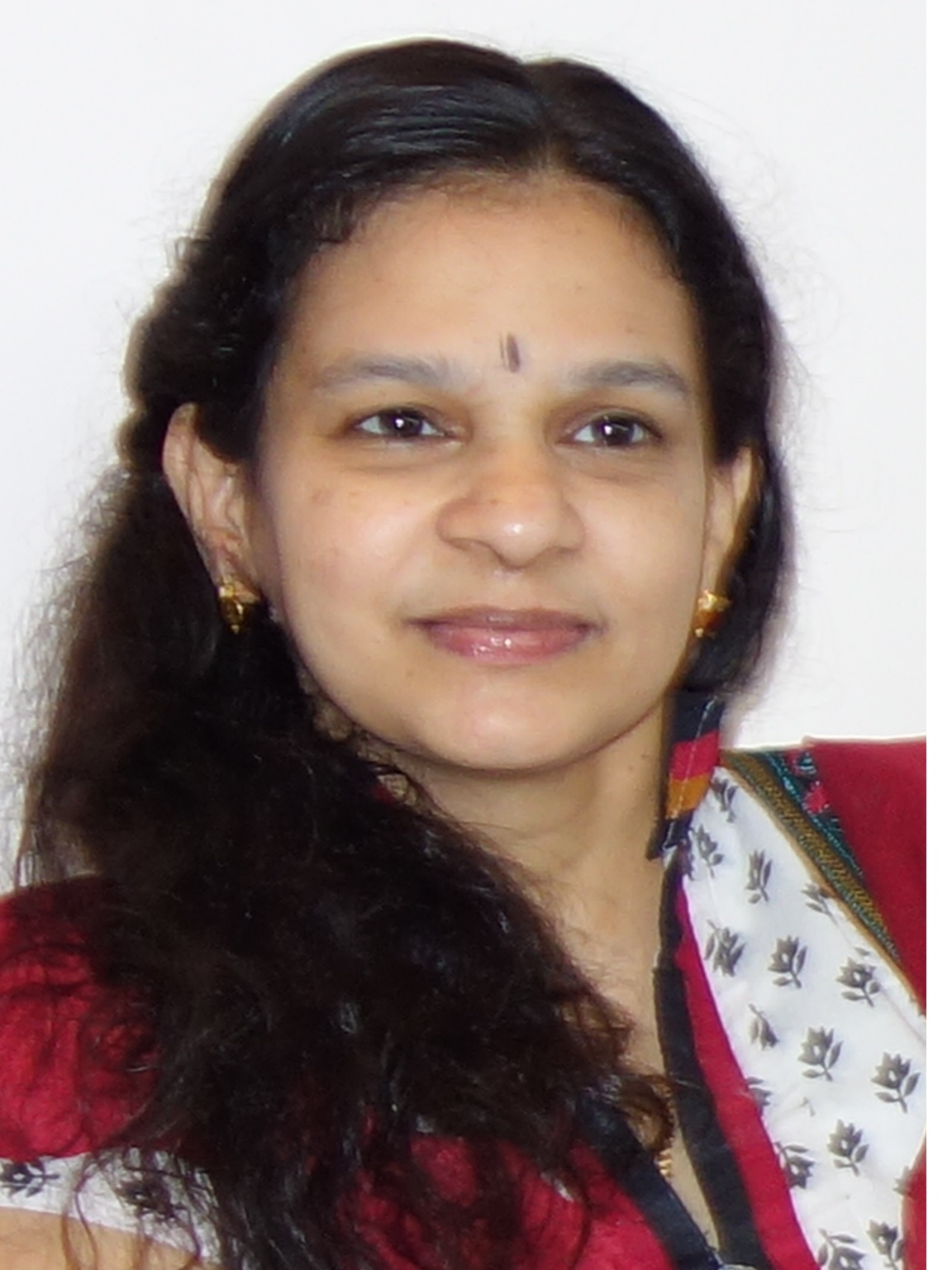
- Smt. Subha Varier Scientist Engineer
- Education: College of Engineering, Trivandrum
- Occupation: space engineer
- Employer: Indian Space Research Organisation
- Known for: Videoing 104 satellites as they were released
- Spouse: Raghu
- Children: two

Subha Varier is an Indian space engineer. She has specialised in the video systems used on Indian satellite launches. In 2017 she received the Nari Shakti Puraskar, India's highest award for women after the record release of 104 satellites in one launch.

== Life ==
Varier grew up in Alappuzha. She graduated in Electronic and Communication Engineering from the College of Engineering, Trivandrum.

In 1991 she joined the Indian Space Research Organisation. She was based at the Vikram Sarabhai Space Centre's avionics division.

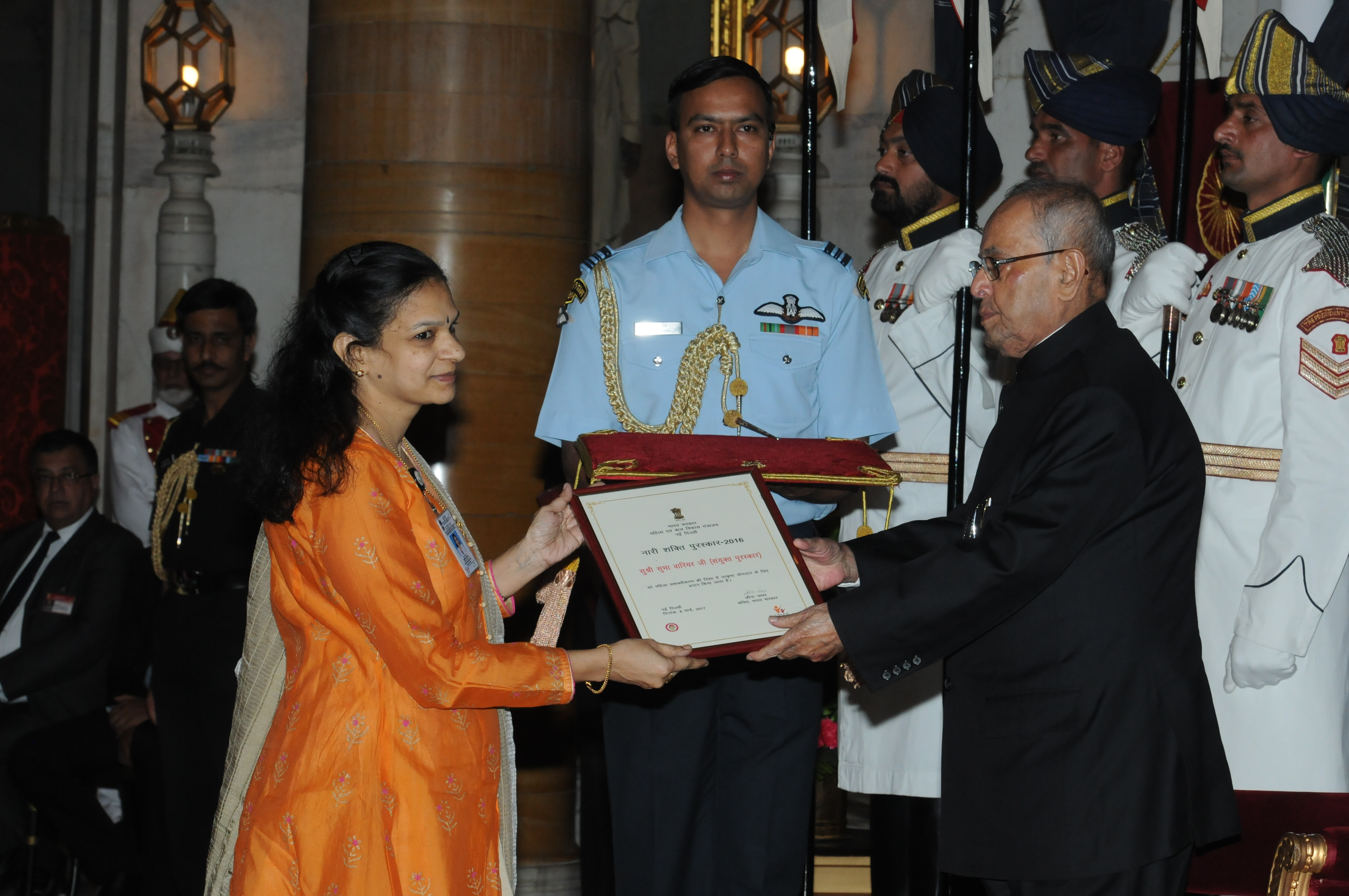
Receiving the Nari Shakti Puraskar from President Pranab Mukherjee in 2017

The PSLV C37 space mission was intended to place 104 satellites in Sun-synchronous orbits on February 15, 2017. The satellites belonged to six different nations and it was important that not only did each satellite launch without touching another, but that there was proof that this had happened. Video of the release needed to be convincing and Varier was given the task. The launch was successful and it was recorded by eight different cameras. The resulting video was then processed, compressed and sent back to earth. The video was decoded and played in real time as the satellites were released. Afterwards the video was viewed the files were then sent to a VSSC web repository.

In March 2017, she was one of the three scientists including Anatta Sonney and B. Codanayaguy who were chosen to receive an award from the Indian President. On International Women's Day in 2017, she was in New Delhi where she was awarded the Nari Shakti Puraskar by President Pranab Mukherjee at the Rashtrapati Bhavan. Each of the awardees received a citation and 100,000 rupees.

== Private life ==
Varier and her husband Raghu have two children. Her husband also works at VSSC and they live at Ambalamukku near Kowdiar.
