= Mailbox (application) =

Defunct freeware email management application

- Mailbox running on iOS
- Original authors: Orchestra, Inc.
- Developer: Dropbox, Inc.
- Release: February 7, 2013
- Operating system: iOS, Android, OS X (beta)
- Type: Email client
- License: Freeware
- Website: www.mailboxapp.com

Mailbox was a freeware email management application for iOS and Android, developed by Orchestra, Inc. It drew the attention of numerous technology blogs for its usability and innovative features, such as swipe-based email sorting, snoozing and filtering. Weeks before its launch, a pre-registration period resulted in a waiting list of over 380,000 reservations. Upon its iOS launch on 7 February 2013, Mailbox became the second-most-downloaded free app in the App Store that day.

In March 2013, Orchestra was acquired by Dropbox. The rollout of Mailbox was sped up and the pre-registration period ended in April. In April 2014, Dropbox released Mailbox for Android and announced a public beta version for OS X, which was released in August.

In December 2015, Dropbox announced the discontinuation of Mailbox, saying that they were not able to "fundamentally fix email" with it and that they rather focus on "[streamlining] the workflows that generate so much email". It was ultimately discontinued on February 26, 2016, as announced earlier.

== Features ==
Mailbox focused on emptying the user's inbox and favored using folders instead of leaving emails in the inbox. For instance, it incentivized the user with visual cues and gestures to organize emails based on priority and due date to empty to inbox.

Mailbox was limited to Gmail and iCloud accounts. It also supported Yahoo! Mail for three days. Setting up Mailbox required granting the company's servers access to the user's email account, either through APIs (Gmail) or direct access (iCloud). Mailbox's servers repeatedly queried the user's email account to provide push notifications and allowed the application to refresh its content without having to run in the background for prolonged periods.

== See also ==
- CloudMagic
- Inbox by Gmail
- Outlook Mobile
- Sparrow (email client)
