= Redpoint Ventures =

American venture capital firm

- Type: Private
- Industry: Venture capital
- Founded: 1999; 27 years ago
- Headquarters: Menlo Park, California, United States
- Products: Investments
- Total assets: $4.5 billion (2025)
- Number of employees: 37
- Website: redpoint.com

Redpoint Ventures is an American venture capital firm focused on investments in seed, early and growth-stage companies. It had US$4.5 billion in assets under management as of 2025.

== History ==
The firm was founded in 1999 and is headquartered in Menlo Park, California, with offices in San Francisco, Los Angeles, Beijing and Shanghai.

The firm's partners include Alex Bard, Allen Beasley, Erica Brescia, Jeff Brody, Satish Dharmaraj, Tom Dyal, Tim Haley, Brad Jones, Annie Kadavy, Chris Moore, Lars Pedersen, Scott Raney, John Walecka, Geoff Yang and David Yuan. The founders of Redpoint Ventures have been involved with successful investments including Foundry, Juniper Networks, Netflix and Right Media. Its partners have been involved in 136 IPOs and acquisitions. IPOs include Snowflake, Twilio, Pure Storage, 2u, Just Eat, Zendesk, HomeAway, Qihoo, Responsys, Fortinet and Calix. Acquisitions include Acompli, Caspida, Efficient Frontier, Heroku, RelateIQ, BlueKai, Posterous, Trip.com, LifeSize, Refresh, Right Media and Zimbra.

In 1999, Redpoint raised a $600 million venture fund, at the time the largest first-time fund for a new firm. In 2000 and 2006, Redpoint raised two additional funds, Redpoint II and Redpoint III totaling $1.15 billion.

In 2007, Redpoint raised a $250 million fund to focus on investing in early growth technology companies such as Answers.com, Internet Brands, NextG Networks, and Tantalus. In February 2010, Redpoint raised $400 million for its fourth fund Redpoint IV, to focus on early stage companies involved in Internet and social media, mobile computing, cloud computing and clean technology.

Redpoint raised a $400 million fifth fund, Redpoint V, in January 2013, to focus on early-stage investments in new platforms, next generation media, big data infrastructure and applications, and enterprise, cloud, and mobile.

In April 2015, Redpoint raised a $400 million VI fund to focus on early stage investments in consumer and enterprise. In 2018, it raised another $400 million for its seventh fund, VII.

In January 2019, Redpoint China Ventures raised two new funds totaling $400 Million to focus on consumer, enterprise and emerging frontier tech startups based in China. In November 2021, The Wall Street Journal reported that Redpoint Ventures is a major investor in Chinese semiconductor firms, raising U.S. national security concerns.

In 2022, Redpoint raised a $650 million ninth fund, and in 2025, another $650 million tenth fund.

== Investments ==
- 9flats
- Abridge
- AppZen
- Arista
- Gradient Labs
- Hashicorp
- Lorra
- Netflix
- Owner.com
- Snowflake
- Stripe
- Ramp
- Twilio
- NorthOne
- Scribe
