= Microsoft Windows version history =

Microsoft Windows was announced by Bill Gates on November 10, 1983, two years before it was first released. Microsoft introduced Windows as a graphical user interface for MS-DOS, which had been introduced two years earlier, on August 12, 1981. The product line evolved in the 1990s from an operating environment into a fully complete, modern operating system over two lines of development, each with their own separate codebase.

The first versions of Windows (1.0 through 2.0) were graphical shells that ran from MS-DOS. The Windows 3x series in its 386 Enhanced Mode used MS-DOS as a bootloader and displaced it as a virtual machine monitor. Windows 95 also had a significant amount of 16-bit code ported from Windows 3.1. Windows 95 introduced multiple features that have been part of the product ever since, including the Start menu, the taskbar, and Windows Explorer (renamed File Explorer in Windows 8). In 1997, Microsoft released Internet Explorer 4 which included the (at the time controversial) Windows Desktop Update. It aimed to integrate Internet Explorer and the web into the user interface and also brought new features into Windows, such as the ability to display JPEG images as the desktop wallpaper and single window navigation in Windows Explorer. In 1998, Microsoft released Windows 98, which also included the Windows Desktop Update and Internet Explorer 4 by default. The inclusion of Internet Explorer 4 and the Desktop Update led to an antitrust case in the United States. Windows 98 included USB support out of the box, and also plug and play, which allows devices to work when plugged in without requiring a system reboot or manual configuration. Windows Me, the last DOS-based version of Windows, was aimed at consumers and released in 2000. It introduced System Restore, Help and Support Center, updated versions of the Disk Defragmenter and other system tools.

In 1993, Microsoft released Windows NT 3.1, the first version of the newly developed Windows NT operating system, followed by Windows NT 3.5 in 1994, and Windows NT 3.51 in 1995. "NT" is an initialism for "New Technology". Unlike the Windows 9x series of operating systems, it was a fully 32-bit operating system. NT 3.1 introduced NTFS, a file system designed to replace the older File Allocation Table (FAT) which was used by DOS and the DOS-based Windows operating systems. In 1996, Windows NT 4.0 was released, which included a fully 32-bit version of Windows Explorer written specifically for it, making the operating system work like Windows 95. Windows NT was originally designed to be used on high-end systems and servers, but with the release of Windows 2000, many consumer-oriented features from Windows 95 and Windows 98 were included, such as the Windows Desktop Update, Internet Explorer 5, USB support and Windows Media Player. These consumer-oriented features were further extended in Windows XP in 2001, which included a new visual style called Luna, a more user-friendly interface, updated versions of Windows Media Player and Internet Explorer 6 by default, and extended features from Windows Me, such as the Help and Support Center and System Restore.

Windows Vista, which was released in 2007, focused on securing the Windows operating system against computer viruses and other malicious software by introducing features such as User Account Control. New features include Windows Aero, updated versions of the standard games (e.g. Solitaire), Windows Movie Maker, and Windows Mail to replace Outlook Express. Despite this, Windows Vista received negative reviews from technology publications, which cited performance issues on older hardware and higher system requirements. Windows 7 followed in 2009 nearly three years after its launch, and despite it technically having higher system requirements, reviewers noted that it ran better than Windows Vista. Windows 7 removed many applications, such as Windows Movie Maker, Windows Photo Gallery and Windows Mail, instead requiring users to download separate Windows Live Essentials to gain some of those features and other online services. Windows 8, which was released in 2012, introduced many controversial changes, such as the replacement of the Start menu with the Start Screen, the removal of the Aero interface in favor of a flat, colored interface as well as the introduction of "Metro" apps (later renamed to Universal Windows Platform (UWP) apps), and the Charms Bar user interface element, all of which received considerable criticism from reviewers. Windows 8.1, a free upgrade to Windows 8, was released in 2013.

The following version of Windows, Windows 10, which was released in 2015, reintroduced the Start menu and added the ability to run Universal Windows Platform apps in a window instead of always in full screen. Windows 10 was generally well-received, with many reviewers stating that Windows 10 is what Windows 8 should have been.

The latest version of Windows, Windows 11, was released to the general public on October 5, 2021. Windows 11 incorporates a redesigned user interface, including a new Start menu, a visual style featuring rounded corners, and a new layout for the Microsoft Store, and also included Microsoft Edge by default.

== Windows 1.0 ==
Windows development started back in 1983, and it was a joke in the industry ... Betting the company on it was a big, big bet.

— Chris Pratley of Microsoft, 2004

Windows 1.0, (series 1.01, 1.02, 1.03, and 1.04) the first independent version of Microsoft Windows, released on November 20, 1985, achieved little popularity. The project was briefly codenamed "Interface Manager" before the windowing system was implemented—contrary to popular belief that it was the original name for Windows and Rowland Hanson, the head of marketing at Microsoft, convinced the company that the name Windows would be more appealing to customers.

The logo of Windows 1.x and 2.x

Windows 1.0 was not a complete operating system, but rather an "operating environment" that extended MS-DOS, and shared the latter's inherent flaws.

The first version of Microsoft Windows included a simple graphics painting program called Windows Paint; Windows Write, a simple word processor; an appointment calendar; a card-filer; a notepad; a clock; a control panel; a computer terminal; Clipboard; and RAM driver. It also included the MS-DOS Executive and a game called Reversi.

Microsoft had worked with Apple Computer to develop applications for Apple's new Macintosh computer, which featured a graphical user interface. As part of the related business negotiations, Microsoft had licensed certain aspects of the Macintosh user interface from Apple; in later litigation, a district court summarized these aspects as "screen displays". In the development of Windows 1.0, Microsoft intentionally limited its borrowing of certain GUI elements from the Macintosh user interface, to comply with its license. For example, windows were only displayed "tiled" on the screen; that is, they could not overlap or overlie one another.

On December 31, 2001, Microsoft declared Windows 1.0 obsolete and stopped providing support and updates for the system.

== OS/2 and Windows 2.x ==
Logo of OS/2 1.x

Ironically, Microsoft is competing against itself in the operating systems market. Besides Xenix, Microsoft has announced Windows 386, which [is] somewhat similar to OS/2. Of course, either way users turn, Microsoft wins.

— Computerworld, 1987

During the mid to late 1980s, Microsoft and IBM had cooperatively been developing OS/2 as a successor to DOS. OS/2 would take full advantage of the aforementioned protected mode of the Intel 80286 processor and up to 16 MB of memory. OS/2 1.0, released in 1987, supported swapping and multitasking and allowed running of MS-DOS executables.

IBM licensed Windows' GUI for OS/2 as Presentation Manager, and the two companies stated that it and Windows 2.0 would be almost identical. By 1987 Computerworld said that Microsoft's Bill Gates "has pushed [Windows] almost fanatically for years", telling skeptical DOS software companies like Ashton-Tate and Lotus Development that developing for Windows was vital to compatibility with future DOS versions. In a 1987 interview with Gates, Ed Esber of Ashton-Tate, and Jim Manzi of Lotus, Gates said that Microsoft would release Windows applications first with "very cheap upgrades" to OS/2 versions, while the others said that their companies would release for OS/2 first. By then Microsoft gave more support to Windows software developers than those for DOS, providing marketing and new product release information. Presentation Manager was not available with OS/2 until version 1.1, released in 1988. Its API was incompatible with Windows. Version 1.2, released in 1989, introduced a new file system, HPFS, to replace the FAT file system.

Logo of OS/2 2.x

By the early 1990s, conflicts developed in the Microsoft/IBM relationship. They cooperated with each other in developing their PC operating systems and had access to each other's code. Microsoft wanted to further develop Windows, while IBM desired for future work to be based on OS/2. In an attempt to resolve this tension, IBM and Microsoft agreed that IBM would develop OS/2 2.0, to replace OS/2 1.3 and Windows 3.0, while Microsoft would develop the next version, OS/2 3.0.

This agreement soon fell apart however, and the Microsoft/IBM relationship was terminated. IBM continued to develop OS/2, while Microsoft changed the name of its (as yet unreleased) OS/2 3.0 to Windows NT. Both retained the rights to use OS/2 and Windows technology developed up to the termination of the agreement; Windows NT, however, was to be written anew, mostly independently (see below).

After an interim 1.3 version to fix up many remaining problems with the 1.x series, IBM released OS/2 version 2.0 in 1992. This was a major improvement: it featured a new, object-oriented GUI, the Workplace Shell (WPS), that included a desktop and was considered by many to be OS/2's best feature. Microsoft would later imitate much of it in Windows 95. Version 2.0 also provided a full 32-bit API, offered smooth multitasking and could take advantage of the 4 gigabytes of address space provided by the Intel 80386. Still, much of the system had 16-bit code internally which required, among other things, device drivers to be 16-bit code as well. This was one of the reasons for the chronic shortage of OS/2 drivers for the latest devices. Version 2.0 could also run DOS and Windows 3.0 programs, since IBM had retained the right to use the DOS and Windows code as a result of the breakup.

Microsoft Windows version 2.0 (2.01 and 2.03 internally) came out on December 9, 1987, and proved slightly more popular than its predecessor. Much of the popularity for Windows 2.0 came by way of its inclusion as a "run-time version" with Microsoft's new graphical applications, Excel and Word for Windows. They could be run from MS-DOS, executing Windows for the duration of their activity, and closing down Windows upon exit.

Microsoft Windows received a major boost around this time when Aldus PageMaker appeared in a Windows version, having previously run only on Macintosh. Some computer historians date this, the first appearance of a significant and non-Microsoft application for Windows, as the start of the success of Windows.

Like prior versions of Windows, version 2.0 could use the real-mode memory model, which confined it to a maximum of 1 megabyte of memory. In such a configuration, it could run under another multitasker like DESQview, which used the 286 protected mode. It was also the first version to support the High Memory Area when running on an Intel 80286 compatible processor. This edition was renamed Windows/286 with the release of Windows 2.1.

A separate Windows/386 edition had a protected mode kernel, which required an 80386 compatible processor, with LIM-standard EMS emulation and VxD drivers in the kernel. All Windows and DOS-based applications at the time were real mode, and Windows/386 could run them over the protected mode kernel by using the virtual 8086 mode, which was new with the 80386 processor.

Version 2.1 came out on May 27, 1988, followed by version 2.11 on March 13, 1989; they included a few minor changes.

In Apple Computer, Inc. v. Microsoft Corp., version 2.03, and later 3.0, faced challenges from Apple over its overlapping windows and other features Apple charged mimicked the ostensibly copyrighted "look and feel" of its operating system and "embodie[d] and generated a copy of the Macintosh" in its OS. Judge William Schwarzer dropped all but 10 of Apple's 189 claims of copyright infringement, and ruled that most of the remaining 10 were over uncopyrightable ideas.

On December 31, 2001, Microsoft declared Windows 2.x obsolete and stopped providing support and updates for the system.

== Windows 3.0 ==
The logo of Windows 3.0

Windows 3.0, released in May 1990, improved capabilities given to native applications. It also allowed users to better multitask older MS-DOS based software compared to Windows/386, thanks to the introduction of virtual memory.

Windows 3.0's user interface finally resembled a serious competitor to the user interface of the Macintosh computer. PCs had improved graphics by this time, due to VGA video cards, and the protected/enhanced mode allowed Windows applications to use more memory in a more painless manner than their DOS counterparts could. Windows 3.0 could run in real, standard, or 386 enhanced modes, and was compatible with any Intel processor from the 8086/8088 up to the 80286 and 80386. This was the first version to run Windows programs in protected mode, although the 386 enhanced mode kernel was an enhanced version of the protected mode kernel in Windows/386.

Windows 3.0 received two updates. A few months after introduction, Windows 3.0a was released as a maintenance release, resolving bugs and improving stability. A "multimedia" version, Windows 3.0 with Multimedia Extensions 1.0, was released in October 1991. This was bundled with "multimedia upgrade kits", comprising a CD-ROM drive and a sound card, such as the Creative Labs Sound Blaster Pro. This version was the precursor to the multimedia features available in Windows 3.1 (first released in April 1992) and later, and was part of Microsoft's specification for the Multimedia PC.

The features listed above and growing market support from application software developers made Windows 3.0 wildly successful, selling around 10 million copies in the two years before the release of version 3.1. Windows 3.0 became a major source of income for Microsoft, and led the company to revise some of its earlier plans. Support was discontinued on December 31, 2001.

== Windows 3.1 ==
In response to the impending release of OS/2 2.0, Microsoft developed Windows 3.1 (first released in April 1992), which included several improvements to Windows 3.0, such as display of TrueType scalable fonts (developed jointly with Apple), improved disk performance in 386 Enhanced Mode, multimedia support, and bugfixes. It also removed Real Mode, and only ran on an 80286 or better processor. Later Microsoft also released Windows 3.11, a touch-up to Windows 3.1 which included all of the patches and updates that followed the release of Windows 3.1 in 1992.

The logo of Windows 3.1 and NT 3.x

In 1992 and 1993, Microsoft released Windows for Workgroups (WfW), which was available both as an add-on for existing Windows 3.1 installations and in a version that included the base Windows environment and the networking extensions all in one package. Windows for Workgroups included improved network drivers and protocol stacks, and support for peer-to-peer networking. There were two versions of Windows for Workgroups – 3.1 and 3.11. Unlike prior versions, Windows for Workgroups 3.11 ran in 386 Enhanced Mode only, and needed at least an 80386SX processor. One optional download for WfW was the "Wolverine" TCP/IP protocol stack, which allowed for easy access to the Internet through corporate networks.

All these versions continued version 3.0's impressive sales pace. Even though the 3.1x series still lacked most of the important features of OS/2, such as long file names, a desktop, or preemptive multitasking, Microsoft quickly took over the OS and GUI markets for the IBM PC. The Windows API became the de facto standard for consumer software.

On December 31, 2001, Microsoft declared Windows 3.1 obsolete and stopped providing support and updates for the system. However, OEM licensing for Windows for Workgroups 3.11 on embedded systems continued to be available until November 1, 2008.

== Windows NT 3.x ==
Meanwhile, Microsoft continued to develop Windows NT (for business users at the time). The main architect of the system was Dave Cutler, one of the chief architects of VAX/VMS at Digital Equipment Corporation. Microsoft hired him in October 1988 to create a successor to OS/2, but Cutler created a completely new system instead. Cutler had been developing a follow-on to VMS at DEC called MICA, and when DEC dropped the project he brought the expertise and around 20 engineers with him to Microsoft.

Windows NT Workstation (Microsoft marketing wanted Windows NT to appear to be a continuation of Windows 3.1) arrived in Beta form to developers at the July 1992 Professional Developers Conference in San Francisco. Microsoft announced at the conference its intentions to develop a successor to both Windows NT and Windows 3.1's replacement (Windows 95, codenamed Chicago), which would unify the two into one operating system. This successor was codenamed Cairo. In hindsight, Cairo was a much more difficult project than Microsoft had anticipated and, as a result, NT and Chicago would not be unified until Windows XP—albeit Windows 2000, oriented to business, had already unified most of the system's bolts and gears, it was XP that was sold to home consumers like Windows 95 and came to be viewed as the final unified OS. Parts of Cairo have still not made it into Windows as of 2025: most notably, the WinFS file system, which was the much touted Object File System of Cairo. Microsoft announced in 2006 that they would not make a separate release of WinFS for Windows XP and Windows Vista and would gradually incorporate the technologies developed for WinFS in other products and technologies, notably Microsoft SQL Server.

Driver support was lacking due to the increased programming difficulty in dealing with NT's superior hardware abstraction model. This problem plagued the NT line all the way through Windows 2000. Programmers complained that it was too hard to write drivers for NT, and hardware developers were not going to go through the trouble of developing drivers for a small segment of the market. Additionally, although allowing for good performance and fuller exploitation of system resources, it was also resource-intensive on limited hardware, and thus was only suitable for larger, more expensive machines.

However, these same features made Windows NT perfect for the LAN server market (which in 1993 was experiencing a rapid boom, as office networking was becoming common). NT also had advanced network connectivity options and NTFS, an efficient file system. Windows NT version 3.51 was Microsoft's entry into this field, and took away market share from Novell (the dominant player) in the following years.

One of Microsoft's biggest advances initially developed for Windows NT was a new 32-bit API, to replace the legacy 16-bit Windows API. This API was called Win32, and from then on Microsoft referred to the older 16-bit API as Win16. The Win32 API had three levels of implementation: the complete one for Windows NT, a subset for Chicago (originally called Win32c) missing features primarily of interest to enterprise customers (at the time) such as security and Unicode support, and a more limited subset called Win32s which could be used on Windows 3.1 systems. Thus Microsoft sought to ensure some degree of compatibility between the Chicago design and Windows NT, even though the two systems had radically different internal architectures.

Windows NT was the first Windows operating system based on a hybrid kernel. The hybrid kernel was designed as a modified microkernel, influenced by the Mach microkernel developed by Richard Rashid at Carnegie Mellon University, but without meeting all of the criteria of a pure microkernel.

As released, Windows NT 3.x went through three versions (3.1, 3.5, and 3.51), changes were primarily internal and reflected back end changes. The 3.5 release added support for new types of hardware and improved performance and data reliability; the 3.51 release was primarily to update the Win32 APIs to be compatible with software being written for the Win32c APIs in what became Windows 95. Support for Windows NT 3.51 ended in 2001 and 2002 for the Workstation and Server editions, respectively.

== Windows 95 ==
After Windows 3.11, Microsoft began to develop a new consumer-oriented version of the operating system codenamed Chicago. Chicago was designed to have support for 32-bit preemptive multitasking like OS/2 and Windows NT, although a 16-bit kernel would remain for the sake of backward compatibility. The Win32 API first introduced with Windows NT was adopted as the standard 32-bit programming interface, with Win16 compatibility being preserved through a technique known as "thunking". A new object-oriented GUI was not originally planned as part of the release, although elements of the Cairo user interface were borrowed and added as other aspects of the release (notably Plug and Play) slipped.

Microsoft did not change all of the Windows code to 32-bit; parts of it remained 16-bit (albeit not directly using real mode) for reasons of compatibility, performance, and development time. Additionally it was necessary to carry over design decisions from earlier versions of Windows for reasons of backwards compatibility, even if these design decisions no longer matched a more modern computing environment. These factors eventually began to impact the operating system's efficiency and stability.

The logo of Windows 95 and 98. Compared to the logo of Windows 3.1, it points slightly downwards.

Microsoft marketing adopted Windows 95 as the product name for Chicago when it was released on August 24, 1995. Microsoft had a double gain from its release: first, it made it impossible for consumers to run Windows 95 on a cheaper, non-Microsoft DOS, secondly, although traces of DOS were never completely removed from the system and MS DOS 7 would be loaded briefly as a part of the booting process, Windows 95 applications ran solely in 386 enhanced mode, with a flat 32-bit address space and virtual memory. These features make it possible for Win32 applications to address up to 2 gigabytes of virtual RAM (with another 2 GB reserved for the operating system), and in theory prevented them from inadvertently corrupting the memory space of other Win32 applications. In this respect the functionality of Windows 95 moved closer to Windows NT, although Windows 95/98/Me did not support more than 512 megabytes of physical RAM without obscure system tweaks. Three years after its introduction, Windows 95 was succeeded by Windows 98.

IBM continued to market OS/2, producing later versions in OS/2 3.0 and 4.0 (also called Warp). Responding to complaints about OS/2 2.0's high demands on computer hardware, version 3.0 was significantly optimized both for speed and size. Before Windows 95 was released, OS/2 Warp 3.0 was even shipped pre-installed with several large German hardware vendor chains. However, with the release of Windows 95, OS/2 began to lose market share.

It is probably impossible to choose one specific reason why OS/2 failed to gain much market share. While OS/2 continued to run Windows 3.1 applications, it lacked support for anything but the Win32s subset of Win32 API (see above). Unlike with Windows 3.1, IBM did not have access to the source code for Windows 95 and was unwilling to commit the time and resources to emulate the moving target of the Win32 API. IBM later introduced OS/2 into the United States v. Microsoft case, blaming unfair marketing tactics on Microsoft's part.

Microsoft went on to release five different versions of Windows 95:

- Windows 95 – original release
- Windows 95 A – included Windows 95 OSR1 slipstreamed into the installation
- Windows 95 B (OSR2) – included several major enhancements, Internet Explorer (IE) 3.0 and full FAT32 file system support
- Windows 95 B USB (OSR2.1) – included basic USB support
- Windows 95 C (OSR2.5) – included all the above features, plus IE 4.0; this was the last 95 version produced

OSR2, OSR2.1, and OSR2.5 were not released to the general public, rather, they were available only to OEMs that would preload the OS onto computers. Some companies sold new hard drives with OSR2 preinstalled (officially justifying this as needed due to the hard drive's capacity).

The first Microsoft Plus! add-on pack was sold for Windows 95. Microsoft ended extended support for Windows 95 on December 31, 2001.

=== Phases in development ===
Release name	Build Number	Release date	Kernel
Milestone 4	58s	1993-08-09	4.00
Milestone 5	81	1994-01-19	4.00
Beta 1/Milestone 6	189	1994-09-21	4.00
Beta 2/Milestone 7	225	1994-12-01	4.00
Beta 3/Milestone 8	347	1995-03-02	4.00
Release Candidate 1	435	1995-03-28	4.00
April Test Release	462	1995-05-02	4.00
May Test Release	480	1995-05-24	4.00
June Test Release	501	1995-06-21	4.00
Pre-RTM	950	1995-07-06	4.00

== Windows NT 4.0 ==
Microsoft released the successor to NT 3.51, Windows NT 4.0, on August 24, 1996, one year after the release of Windows 95. It was Microsoft's primary business-oriented operating system until the introduction of Windows 2000. Major new features included the new Explorer shell from Windows 95, scalability and feature improvements to the core architecture, kernel, USER32, COM and MSRPC.

Windows NT 4.0 came in five versions:

- Windows NT 4.0 Workstation
- Windows NT 4.0 Server
- Windows NT 4.0 Server, Enterprise Edition (includes support for 8-way SMP and clustering)
- Windows NT 4.0 Terminal Server
- Windows NT 4.0 Embedded

Microsoft ended mainstream support for Windows NT 4.0 Workstation on June 30, 2002, and ended extended support on June 30, 2004, while Windows NT 4.0 Server mainstream support ended on December 31, 2002, and extended support ended on December 31, 2004. Both editions were succeeded by Windows 2000 Professional and the Windows 2000 Server Family, respectively.

Microsoft ended mainstream support for Windows NT 4.0 Embedded on June 30, 2003, and ended extended support on July 11, 2006. This edition was succeeded by Windows XP Embedded.

== Windows 98 ==
Windows 98 desktop

On June 25, 1998, Microsoft released Windows 98 (code-named Memphis), three years after the release of Windows 95, two years after the release of Windows NT 4.0, and 21 months before the release of Windows 2000. It included new hardware drivers and the FAT32 file system which supports disk partitions that are larger than 2 GB (first introduced in Windows 95 OSR2). USB support in Windows 98 is marketed as a vast improvement over Windows 95. The release continued the controversial inclusion of the Internet Explorer browser with the operating system that started with Windows 95 OEM Service Release 1. The action eventually led to the filing of the United States v. Microsoft case, dealing with the question of whether Microsoft was introducing unfair practices into the market in an effort to eliminate competition from other companies such as Netscape.

In 1999, Microsoft released Windows 98 Second Edition, an interim release. One of the more notable new features was the addition of Internet Connection Sharing, a form of network address translation, allowing several machines on a LAN (Local Area Network) to share a single Internet connection. Hardware support through device drivers was increased and this version shipped with Internet Explorer 5. Many minor problems that existed in the first edition were fixed making it, according to many, the most stable release of the Windows 9x family.

Mainstream support for Windows 98 and 98 SE ended on June 30, 2002. Extended support ended on July 11, 2006.

== Windows 2000 ==
Windows 2000 wordmark

Microsoft released Windows 2000 on February 17, 2000, as the successor to Windows NT 4.0, 17 months after the release of Windows 98. It has the version number Windows NT 5.0, and it was Microsoft's business-oriented operating system starting with the official release on February 17, 2000, until 2001 when it was succeeded by Windows XP.

Windows 2000 has had four official service packs. It was successfully deployed both on the server and the workstation markets. Amongst Windows 2000's most significant new features was Active Directory, a near-complete replacement of the NT 4.0 Windows Server domain model, which built on industry-standard technologies like DNS, LDAP, and Kerberos to connect machines to one another. Terminal Services, previously only available as a separate edition of NT 4, was expanded to all server versions. Support for the New Technology File System (NTFS) was added for the first time to a Windows version targeted to consumers, removing the 4 GiB file size limitation.

Windows 2000 is the last public release of Windows for the PC-98 and SGI Visual Workstation 320 and 540. In addition, it is also the last version of Windows NT to support the i486 line of processors as Windows XP supported the original Pentium and higher CPUs only. A number of features from Windows 98 were incorporated also, such as an improved Device Manager, Windows Media Player, and a revised DirectX that made it possible for the first time for many modern games to work on the NT kernel. Windows 2000 is also the last NT-kernel Windows operating system to lack product activation.

While Windows 2000 upgrades were available for Windows 95 and Windows 98, it was not intended for home users.

Windows 2000 was available in four editions:

- Windows 2000 Professional
- Windows 2000 Server
- Windows 2000 Advanced Server
- Windows 2000 Datacenter Server

Microsoft ended support for both Windows 2000 and Windows XP Service Pack 2 on July 13, 2010.

== Windows Me ==
Windows Me desktop

On September 14, 2000, Microsoft released a successor to Windows 98 called Windows Me, short for "Millennium Edition". It was the last DOS-based operating system from Microsoft. Windows Me introduced a new multimedia-editing application called Windows Movie Maker, came standard with Internet Explorer 5.5 and Windows Media Player 7, and debuted the first version of System Restore – a recovery utility that enables the operating system to revert system files back to a prior date and time. System Restore was a notable feature that would continue to thrive in all later versions of Windows.

Windows Me was conceived as a quick one-year project that served as a stopgap release between Windows 98 and Windows XP. Many of the new features were available from the Windows Update site as updates for older Windows versions (System Restore and Windows Movie Maker were exceptions). Windows Me was criticized for stability issues, as well as for lacking real mode DOS support, to the point of being referred to as the "Mistake Edition". Windows Me was the last operating system to be based on the Windows 9x (monolithic) kernel and MS-DOS, with its successor Windows XP being based on Microsoft's Windows NT kernel instead. It is also the last version of Windows overall to support the 486 line of processors as its successor only supported 5th generation x86 CPUs and later.

== Windows XP and Windows Server 2003 ==
Windows XP desktop

On October 25, 2001, Microsoft released Windows XP (codenamed "Whistler"). The merging of the Windows NT/2000 and Windows 95/98/Me lines was finally achieved with Windows XP. Windows XP uses the Windows NT 5.1 kernel, marking the entrance of the Windows NT core to the consumer market, to replace the aging Windows 9x branch. The initial release was met with considerable criticism, particularly in the area of security, leading to the release of three major Service Packs. Windows XP SP1 was released in September 2002, SP2 was released in August 2004 and SP3 was released in April 2008. Service Pack 2 provided significant improvements and encouraged widespread adoption of XP among both home and business users. Windows XP was one of Microsoft's longest-running flagship operating systems, beginning with the public release on October 25, 2001, for at least 5 years, and ending on January 30, 2007, when it was succeeded by Windows Vista.

Windows XP is available in a number of versions:

- Windows XP Home Edition, for home users
- Windows XP Professional, for business and power users contained a number of features not available in Home Edition.
- Windows XP N, like above editions, but without a default installation of Windows Media Player, as mandated by a European Union ruling

Windows XP wordmark

- Windows XP Media Center Edition (MCE), released in October 2002 for desktops and notebooks with an emphasis on home entertainment. Contained all features offered in Windows XP Professional and the Windows Media Center. Subsequent versions are the same but have an updated Windows Media Center.
  - Windows XP Media Center Edition 2004, released on September 30, 2003
  - Windows XP Media Center Edition 2005, released on October 12, 2004. Included the Royale theme, support for Media Center Extenders, themes and screensavers from Microsoft Plus! for Windows XP. The ability to join an Active Directory domain is disabled.
- Windows XP Tablet PC Edition, for tablet PCs
  - Windows XP Tablet PC Edition 2005
- Windows XP Embedded, for embedded systems
- Windows XP Starter Edition, for new computer users in developing countries
- Windows XP Professional x64 Edition, released on April 25, 2005, for home and workstation systems utilizing 64-bit processors based on the x86-64 instruction set originally developed by AMD as AMD64; Intel calls their version Intel 64. Internally, XP x64 was a somewhat updated version of Windows based on the Server 2003 codebase.
- Windows XP 64-bit Edition, is a version for Intel's Itanium line of processors; maintains 32-bit compatibility solely through a software emulator. It is roughly analogous to Windows XP Professional in features. It was discontinued in September 2005 when the last vendor of Itanium workstations stopped shipping Itanium systems marketed as "Workstations".

=== Windows Server 2003 ===
Windows Server 2003 desktop

On April 25, 2003, Microsoft launched Windows Server 2003, a notable update to Windows 2000 Server encompassing many new security features, a new "Manage Your Server" wizard that simplifies configuring a machine for specific roles, and improved performance. It is based on the Windows NT 5.2 kernel. A few services not essential for server environments are disabled by default for stability reasons, most noticeable are the "Windows Audio" and "Themes" services; users have to enable them manually to get sound or the "Luna" look as per Windows XP. The hardware acceleration for display is also turned off by default, users have to turn the acceleration level up themselves if they trust the display card driver.

In March 2006, Microsoft released Windows Server 2003 R2, which is actually Windows Server 2003 with SP1 (Service Pack 1), together with an add-on package. Among the new features are a number of management features for branch offices, file serving, printing and company-wide identity integration.

Windows Server 2003 is available in six editions:

- Web Edition (32-bit)
- Standard Edition (32 and 64-bit)
- Enterprise Edition (32 and 64-bit)
- Datacenter Edition (32 and 64-bit)
- Small Business Server (32-bit)
- Storage Server (OEM channel only)

Windows Server 2003 R2, an update of Windows Server 2003. It is distributed on two CDs, with one CD being the Windows Server 2003 SP1 CD. The other CD adds many optionally installable features for Windows Server 2003. The R2 update was released for all x86 and x64 versions, except Windows Server 2003 R2 Enterprise Edition, which was not released for Itanium.

=== Windows XP x64 and Server 2003 x64 Editions ===
On April 25, 2005, Microsoft released Windows XP Professional x64 Edition and Windows Server 2003, x64 Editions in Standard, Enterprise and Datacenter SKUs. Windows XP Professional x64 Edition is an edition of Windows XP for x86-64 personal computers. It is designed to use the expanded 64-bit memory address space provided by the x86–64 architecture.

Windows XP Professional x64 Edition is based on the Windows Server 2003 codebase, with the server features removed and client features added. Both Windows Server 2003 x64 and Windows XP Professional x64 Edition use identical kernels.

Windows XP Professional x64 Edition is not to be confused with Windows XP 64-bit Edition, as the latter was designed for Intel Itanium processors. During the initial development phases, Windows XP Professional x64 Edition was named Windows XP 64-Bit Edition for 64-Bit Extended Systems.

=== Windows Fundamentals for Legacy PCs ===
Windows Fundamentals for Legacy PCs desktop

In July 2006, Microsoft released a thin-client version of Windows XP Service Pack 2, called Windows Fundamentals for Legacy PCs (WinFLP). It is only available to Software Assurance customers. The aim of WinFLP is to give companies a viable upgrade option for older PCs that are running Windows 95, 98, and Me that will be supported with patches and updates for the next several years. Most user applications will typically be run on a remote machine using Terminal Services or Citrix.

While being visually the same as Windows XP, it has some differences. For example, if the screen has been set to 16-bit colors, the Windows 2000 recycle bin icon and some XP 16-bit icons will show. In addition, Paint and some games like Solitaire are not present.

=== Windows Home Server 2007 ===
Windows Home Server (code-named Q, Quattro) is a server product based on Windows Server 2003, designed for consumer use. The system was announced on January 7, 2007, by Bill Gates. Windows Home Server can be configured and monitored using a console program that can be installed on a client PC. Such features as Media Sharing, local and remote drive backup and file duplication are all listed as features. The release of Windows Home Server Power Pack 3 added support for Windows 7 to Windows Home Server.

== Windows Vista and Windows Server 2008 ==
Windows Vista desktop

Windows Vista was released on November 30, 2006, to business customers—consumer versions followed on January 30, 2007. Windows Vista intended to have enhanced security by introducing a new restricted user mode called User Account Control, replacing the "administrator-by-default" philosophy of Windows XP. Vista was the target of much criticism and negative press, and in general was not well regarded, this was seen as leading to the relatively swift release of Windows 7.

One major difference between Vista and earlier versions of Windows, Windows 95 and later, was that the original start button was replaced with the Windows icon in a circle (called the Start Orb). Vista also featured new graphics features, the Windows Aero GUI, new applications (such as Windows Calendar, Windows DVD Maker and some new games including Chess, Mahjong, and Purble Place), Internet Explorer 7, Windows Media Player 11, and a large number of underlying architectural changes. Windows Vista had the version number NT 6.0. During its lifetime, Windows Vista had two service packs.

Windows Vista shipped in six editions:

- Starter (only available in developing countries)
- Home Basic
- Home Premium
- Business
- Enterprise (only available to large business and enterprise)
- Ultimate (combines both Home Premium and Enterprise)

All editions (except Starter edition) were available in both 32-bit and 64-bit versions. The biggest advantage of the 64-bit version was breaking the 4 gigabyte memory barrier, which 32-bit computers cannot fully access.

=== Windows Server 2008 ===
Windows Server 2008, released on February 27, 2008, was originally known as Windows Server Codename "Longhorn". Windows Server 2008 built on the technological and security advances first introduced with Windows Vista, and was significantly more modular than its predecessor, Windows Server 2003.

Windows Server 2008 shipped in ten editions:

- Windows Server 2008 Foundation (for OEMs only)
- Windows Server 2008 Standard (32-bit and 64-bit)
- Windows Server 2008 Enterprise (32-bit and 64-bit)
- Windows Server 2008 Datacenter (32-bit and 64-bit)
- Windows Server 2008 for Itanium-based Systems (IA-64)
- Windows HPC Server 2008
- Windows Web Server 2008 (32-bit and 64-bit)
- Windows Storage Server 2008 (32-bit and 64-bit)
- Windows Small Business Server 2008 (64-bit only)
- Windows Essential Business Server 2008 (32-bit and 64-bit)

== Windows 7 and Windows Server 2008 R2 ==
Windows 7 desktop

Windows 7 was released to manufacturing on July 22, 2009, and reached general retail availability on October 22, 2009. Since its release, Windows 7 had one service pack.

Some features of Windows 7 were faster booting, Device Stage, PowerShell, less obtrusive User Account Control, multi-touch, and improved window management. The interface was renewed with a bigger taskbar and some improvements in the searching system and the Start menu. Features included with Windows Vista and not in Windows 7 include the sidebar (although gadgets remain) and several programs that were removed in favor of downloading their Windows Live counterparts. Windows 7 met with positive reviews, which said the OS was faster and easier to use than Windows Vista.

Windows 7 shipped in six editions:

- Starter (available worldwide)
- Home Basic
- Home Premium
- Professional
- Enterprise (available to volume-license business customers only)
- Ultimate

In some countries in the European Union, there were other editions that lacked some features such as Windows Media Player, Windows Media Center and Internet Explorer—these editions were called names such as "Windows 7 N." Microsoft focused on selling Windows 7 Home Premium and Professional. All editions, except the Starter edition, were available in both 32-bit and 64-bit versions. Unlike the corresponding Vista editions, the Professional and Enterprise editions were supersets of the Home Premium edition.

At the Professional Developers Conference (PDC) 2008, Microsoft also announced Windows Server 2008 R2, as the server variant of Windows 7. Windows Server 2008 R2 shipped in 64-bit versions (x64 and Itanium) only.

=== Windows Thin PC ===
In 2010, Microsoft released Windows Thin PC or WinTPC, which was a feature-and size-reduced locked-down version of Windows 7 expressly designed to turn older PCs into thin clients. WinTPC was available for software assurance customers and relied on cloud computing in a business network. Wireless operation is supported since WinTPC has full wireless stack integration, but wireless operation may not be as good as the operation on a wired connection.

== Windows Home Server 2011 ==
Windows Home Server 2011 code named 'Vail' was released on April 6, 2011. Windows Home Server 2011 is built on the Windows Server 2008 R2 code base and removed the Drive Extender drive pooling technology in the original Windows Home Server release. Windows Home Server 2011 is considered a "major release". Its predecessor was built on Windows Server 2003. WHS 2011 only supports x86-64 hardware.

Microsoft decided to discontinue Windows Home Server 2011 on July 5, 2012, while including its features into Windows Server 2012 Essentials. Windows Home Server 2011 was supported until April 12, 2016.

== Windows MultiPoint Server 2010 and 2011 ==
Windows MultiPoint Server 2010 and 2011 (WMS 2010 codenamed "Solution Server" and WMS 2011 codenamed "Windows MultiPoint Server 2)" are two specialized versions of windows server 2008 made for educational environments like IT Classes, Educational institutions, Labs and Libraries. Windows MultiPoint Server 2011 comes in the following editions:

- Standard: Limited support of only 10 stations and can't join an Active Directory Domain.
- Premium: Supports up to 20 stations with support to join Active Directory Domain and Hyper-V support

== Windows 8 and Windows Server 2012 ==
On June 1, 2011, Microsoft previewed Windows 8 at both Computex Taipei and the D9: All Things Digital conference in California. The first public preview of Windows Server 2012 was shown by Microsoft at the 2011 Microsoft Worldwide Partner Conference. Windows 8 Release Preview and Windows Server 2012 Release Candidate were both released on May 31, 2012. Product development on Windows 8 was completed on August 1, 2012, and it was released to manufacturing the same day. Windows Server 2012 went on sale to the public on September 4, 2012. Windows 8 went on sale to the public on October 26, 2012. One edition, Windows RT, runs on some system-on-a-chip devices with mobile 32-bit ARM (ARMv7) processors. Windows 8 features a redesigned user interface, designed to make it easier for touchscreen users to use Windows. The interface introduced an updated Start menu known as the Start screen, and a new full-screen application platform. The desktop interface is also present for running windowed applications, although Windows RT will not run any desktop applications not included in the system. On the Building Windows 8 blog, it was announced that a computer running Windows 8 can boot up much faster than Windows 7. New features also include USB 3.0 support, the Windows Store (later renamed Microsoft Store), the ability to run from USB drives with Windows To Go, and others.

Windows 8 is available in the following editions:

- Windows 8
- Windows 8 Pro
- Windows 8 Enterprise
- Windows RT

Microsoft ended support for Windows 8 on January 12, 2016.

== Windows 8.1 and Windows Server 2012 R2 ==
Windows 8.1 and Windows Server 2012 R2 were released on October 17, 2013. Windows 8.1 is available as an update in the Windows Store for Windows 8 users only and also available to download for clean installation. The update adds new options for resizing the live tiles on the Start screen. Windows 8 was given the kernel number NT 6.2, with its successor 8.1 receiving the kernel number 6.3. Neither had any service packs, although many consider Windows 8.1 to be a service pack for Windows 8. However, Windows 8.1 received two main updates in 2014. Both versions received some criticism due to the removal of the Start menu and some difficulties to perform tasks and commands. Windows 8.1 also brought back the start icon at the bottom-left screen.

Windows 8.1 is available in the same editions as its predecessor for users not running Windows 8.

Microsoft ended support on January 10, 2023.

== Windows 10 and corresponding Server versions ==
Windows 10 was unveiled on September 30, 2014, as the successor for Windows 8, and was released on July 29, 2015. It was distributed without charge to Windows 7 and 8.1 users for one year after release. A number of new features like Cortana, the Microsoft Edge web browser, the ability to view Windows Store apps as a window instead of fullscreen, the return of the Start menu, virtual desktops, revamped core apps, Continuum, and a unified Settings app were all features debuted in Windows 10. Like its successor, the operating system was announced as a service OS that would receive constant performance and stability updates. Unlike Windows 8, Windows 10 received mostly positive reviews, praising improvements of stability and practicality than its predecessor, however, it received some criticism due to mandatory update installation, privacy concerns and advertising-supported software tactics.

Although Microsoft claimed Windows 10 would be the last Windows version, eventually a new major release, Windows 11, was announced in 2021. That made Windows 10 last longer as Microsoft's flagship operating system than any other version of Windows, beginning with the public release on July 29, 2015, for six years, and ending on October 5, 2021, when Windows 11 was released. Windows 10 had received thirteen main updates.

=== Stable releases ===
Year	2015		2016	2017	2018	2019	2020	2021	2022
1st Half	—N/a			1703	1803	1903	2004	21H1	—N/a
2nd Half	1507	1511	1607	1709	1809	1909	20H2	21H2	22H2

- Version 1507 (codenamed Threshold 1) was the original version of Windows 10 and released in July 2015. One of the big features was the introduction of Windows Hello, which at launch enabled users to log into Windows with facial recognition if the PC was equipped with a compatible active illuminated near-infrared, NIR, camera.
- Version 1511, announced as the November Update and codenamed Threshold 2. It was released in November 2015. This update added many visual tweaks, such as more consistent context menus and the ability to change the color of window titlebars. Windows 10 can now be activated with a product key for Windows 7 and later, thus simplifying the activation process and essentially making Windows 10 free for anyone who has Windows 7 or later, even after the free upgrade period ended. A "Find My Device" feature was added, allowing users to track their devices if they lose them, similar to the Find My iPhone service that Apple offers. Controversially, the Start menu now displays "featured apps". A few tweaks were added to Microsoft Edge, including tab previews and the ability to sync the browser with other devices running Windows 10. Kernel version number: 10.0.10586.
- Version 1607, announced as the Anniversary Update and codenamed Redstone 1. It was the first of several planned updates with the "Redstone" codename. Its version number, 1607, means that it was supposed to launch in July 2016, however it was delayed until August 2016. Many new features were included in the version, including more integration with Cortana, a dark theme, browser extension support for Microsoft Edge, click-to-play Flash by default, tab pinning, web notifications, swipe navigation in Edge, and the ability for Windows Hello to use a fingerprint sensor to sign into apps and websites, similar to Touch ID on the iPhone. Also added was Windows Ink, which improves digital inking in many apps, and the Windows Ink Workspace which lists pen-compatible apps, as well as quick shortcuts to a sticky notes app and a sketchpad. Microsoft, through their partnership with Canonical, integrated a full Ubuntu Bash shell via the Windows Subsystem for Linux. Notable tweaks in this version of Windows 10 include the removal of the controversial password-sharing feature of Microsoft's Wi-Fi Sense service, a slightly redesigned Start menu, Tablet Mode working more like Windows 8, overhauled emoji, improvements to the lock screen, calendar integration in the taskbar, and the Blue Screen of Death now showing a QR code which users can scan to quickly find out what caused the error. This version of Windows 10's kernel version is 10.0.14393.
- Version 1703, announced as the Creators Update and codenamed Redstone 2. Features for this update include a new Paint 3D application, which allows users to create and modify 3D models, integration with Microsoft's HoloLens and other "mixed-reality" headsets produced by other manufacturers, Windows My People, which allows users to manage contacts, Xbox game broadcasting, support for newly developed APIs such as Windows Display Driver Model (WDDM) 2.2, Dolby Atmos support, improvements to the Settings app, and more Edge and Cortana improvements. This version also included tweaks to system apps, such as an address bar in the Registry Editor, PowerShell being the default command line interface instead of the Command Prompt and the Windows Subsystem for Linux being upgraded to support Ubuntu 16.04. This version of Windows 10 was released on April 11, 2017, as a free update.
- Version 1709, announced as the Fall Creators Update and codenamed Redstone 3. It introduced a new design language—the Fluent Design System and incorporates it in Universal Windows Platform apps (UWP) such as Calculator. It also added new features to the Photos application, which were once available only in Windows Movie Maker.
- Version 1803, announced as the April 2018 Update and codenamed Redstone 4 introduced Timeline, an upgrade to the task view screen such that it has the ability to show past activities and let users resume them. The respective icon on the taskbar was also changed to reflect this upgrade. Strides were taken to incorporate Fluent Design into Windows, which included adding Acrylic transparency to the Taskbar and Taskbar Flyouts. The Settings App was also redesigned to have an Acrylic left pane. Variable Fonts were introduced.
- Version 1809, announced as the Windows 10 October 2018 Update and codenamed Redstone 5 among new features, introduced Dark Mode for File Explorer, Your Phone App to link Android phone with Windows 10, new screenshot tool called Snip & Sketch, Make Text Bigger for easier accessibility, and Clipboard History and Cloud Sync.
- Version 1903, announced as the Windows 10 May 2019 Update, codenamed 19H1, was released on May 21, 2019. It added many new features including the addition of a light theme to the Windows shell and a new feature known as Windows Sandbox, which allowed users to run programs in a throwaway virtual window. Notably, this was the first version to allow an application to default to using UTF-8 as the process code page and to default to UTF-8 as the code page in programs such as Notepad.
- Version 1909, announced as the Windows 10 November 2019 Update, codenamed 19H2, was released on November 12, 2019. It unlocked many features that were already present, but hidden or disabled, on 1903, such as an auto-expanding menu on Start while hovering the mouse on it, OneDrive integration on Windows Search and creating events from the taskbar's clock. Some PCs with version 1903 had already enabled these features without installing 1909.
- Version 2004, announced as the Windows 10 May 2020 Update, codenamed 20H1, was released on May 27, 2020. It introduces several new features such as renaming virtual desktops, GPU temperature control and type of disk on task manager, chat-based interface and window appearance for Cortana, and cloud reinstalling and quick searches (depends from region) for search home.
- Version 20H2, announced as the Windows 10 October 2020 Update, codenamed 20H2, was released on October 20, 2020. It introduces resizing the start menu panels, a graphing mode for Calculator, process architecture view on task manager's Details pane, and optional drivers delivery from Windows Update and an updated in-use location icon on taskbar.
- Version 21H1, announced as the Windows 10 May 2021 Update, codenamed 21H1, was released on May 18, 2021.
- Version 21H2, announced as the Windows 10 November 2021 Update, codenamed 21H2, was released on November 16, 2021.
- Version 22H2, announced as the Windows 10 2022 Update, codenamed 22H2, was released on October 18, 2022. It was the last version of Windows 10.

=== Windows Server 2016 ===
Windows Server 2016 is a release of the Microsoft Windows Server operating system that was unveiled on September 30, 2014. Windows Server 2016 was officially released at Microsoft's Ignite Conference, September 26–30, 2016. It is based on the Windows 10 Anniversary Update codebase.

=== Windows Server 2019 ===
Windows Server 2019 is a release of the Microsoft Windows Server operating system that was announced on March 20, 2018. The first Windows Insider preview version was released on the same day. It was released for general availability on October 2, 2018. Windows Server 2019 is based on the Windows 10 October 2018 Update codebase.

On October 6, 2018, distribution of Windows version 1809 (build 17763) was paused while Microsoft investigated an issue with user data being deleted during an in-place upgrade. It affected systems where a user profile folder (e.g. Documents, Music or Pictures) had been moved to another location, but data was left in the original location. As Windows Server 2019 is based on the Windows version 1809 codebase, it too was removed from distribution at the time, but was re-released on November 13, 2018. The software product life cycle for Server 2019 was reset in accordance with the new release date.

=== Windows Server 2022 ===
Windows Server 2022 was released on August 18, 2021. This is the first NT server version which does not share the build number with any of its client version counterpart, although its codename is 21H2, similar to the Windows 10 November 2021 Update.

== Windows 11 and corresponding Server versions ==
Windows 11 is the latest release of Windows NT, and the successor to Windows 10. It was unveiled on June 24, 2021, and was released on October 5, serving as a free upgrade to compatible Windows 10 devices. The system incorporates a renewed interface called "Mica", which includes translucent backgrounds, rounded edges and color combinations. The taskbar's icons are center aligned by default, while the Start menu replaces the "Live Tiles" with pinned apps and recommended apps and files. The MSN widget panel, the Microsoft Store, and the file browser, among other applications, have also been redesigned. However, some features and programs such as Cortana, Internet Explorer (replaced by Microsoft Edge as the default web browser) and Paint 3D were removed. Apps like 3D Viewer, Paint 3D, Skype and OneNote for Windows 10 can be downloaded from the Microsoft Store. Beginning in 2021, Windows 11 included compatibility with Android applications, however, Microsoft has announced support for Android apps will end in March, 2025; the Amazon Appstore is included in Windows Subsystem for Android. Windows 11 received a positive reception from critics. While it was praised for its redesigned interface, and increased security and productivity, it was criticized for its high system requirements (which includes an installed TPM 2.0 chip, enabling the Secure Boot protocol, and UEFI firmware) and various UI changes and regressions (such as requiring a Microsoft account for first-time setup, preventing users from changing default browsers, and inconsistent dark theme) compared to Windows 10.

=== Stable releases ===
Year	2021	2022	2023	2024	2025	2026
1st Half	—N/a					26H1
2nd Half	21H2	22H2	23H2	24H2	25H2	26H2

- Version 21H2, codenamed "Sun Valley", was the initial version of Windows 11 released on October 5, 2021.
- Version 22H2, announced as the Windows 11 2022 Update, codenamed "Sun Valley 2", was released on September 20, 2022. Features in this Windows 11 version include an updated, UWP version of the Task Manager and the Smart App Control feature within the Windows Security app. This version has had three major updates, with features including tabbed browsing in the File Explorer, iOS support for the Phone Link app, Bluetooth Low Energy audio support, and a preview of Microsoft Copilot within Windows.
- Version 23H2, announced as the Windows 11 2023 Update, codenamed "Sun Valley 3", was released on October 31, 2023.
- Version 24H2, announced as the Windows 11 2024 Update, codenamed "Hudson Valley", was released on October 1, 2024.
- Version 25H2, announced as the Windows 11 2025 Update, was released on September 30, 2025.
- Version 26H1, was released on February 10, 2026. According to Microsoft, the update is intended for "devices with select new silicon" devices and not intended for broad deployment. Hence, for the first time in 10 years, this release will not be available through Windows Update.
- Version 26H2, announced as the Windows 11 2026 Update, was released on September 29, 2026.

=== Windows Server 2025 ===
Windows Server 2025 was released on November 1, 2024. It is graphically based on Windows 11, version 24H2 and uses features like Hotpatching, among others.

== See also ==
- Comparison of operating systems
- History of operating systems
- List of Microsoft codenames
