= Windows Chat =

LAN-based text chatting program

- Developer(s): Microsoft
- Operating system: Microsoft Windows
- Type: LAN messenger
- License: Proprietary software

Windows Chat (not to be confused with Microsoft Comic Chat) is a simple LAN-based text chatting program included in Windows for Workgroups and, later, the Windows NT-line of operating systems, including Windows NT 3.x, NT 4.0, Windows 2000, Windows XP and Windows Server 2003 and also Windows 95. In later Windows versions, the Network DDE service may need to be enabled to receive calls. It utilizes the NetBIOS session service and NetDDE. Users can chat with each other over an IPX LAN. The shortcut to the executable is not present in the Start Menu in newer versions of Windows; it must instead be run by using Start > Run... > WinChat.exe.

Windows Chat utilizes a split screen user interface similar to UNIX talk. Windows Chat is real time text, with typing being transmitted immediately.

Microsoft removed the application from Windows versions from Vista on, with the removal of NetDDE, though the program and the DDE service it needs may be manually installed. However the application can still be used through programs such as virtual machines if earlier versions of Windows are installed on them.

== See also ==
- WinPopup
- Microsoft Comic Chat
- Microsoft V-Chat
