= View-source URI scheme =

URI scheme on browsers

The view-source URI scheme is used by some web browsers to construct URIs that result in the browser displaying the source code of a web page or other web resource.

For example, the URI view-source:https://example.com should show the source of the page located at https://example.com.

In the early Internet, the View Source technique helped people learn by example to create their own web pages.

On 25 May 2011, the 'view-source' URI scheme was officially registered with IANA per RFC 4395.

== Browser support ==
Firefox and Internet Explorer both supported the scheme, but support was dropped from Internet Explorer in Windows XP SP2 due to security problems. Firefox also suffered a similar security issue (by combining view-source and JavaScript URIs), but still supported it in Firefox 1.5 after being fixed. In 2009, a new discovered bug was fixed in Firefox 3.0.9.

Browser	Supported?
Mozilla Firefox	supported
SeaMonkey	supported
Netscape	supported
Internet Explorer 4, 5 and 6	supported
Internet Explorer 6, 7, and 8	not supported after Windows XP SP2
Safari 3.2.1	supported
Safari 5, 6	not supported
Opera 7, 8, 9, 10, 11	not supported
Opera 15 and up	supported
Google Chrome	supported
Web	supported
HP webOS	via third-party app (Internalz Pro)
