= Windows Nashville =

Codename of Microsoft Windows desktop operating system

Nashville
- Version of the Windows 9x operating system
- Microsoft "Nashville" 4.10.999 desktop, with Athena PIM, Start Menu, My Computer and System Properties open
- Developer: Microsoft
- Working state: Historic, never released
- Source model: Closed source
- Latest preview: 4.10.999 / 1996
- Kernel type: Monolithic
- License: Commercial software
- Preceded by: Windows 95 (1995)
- Succeeded by: Windows 98 (1998)
- Official website: www.microsoft.com

Support status
- Cancelled in 1996

Nashville (previously Cleveland), popularly known as Windows 96 by contemporary press, was the codename for a cancelled release of Microsoft Windows scheduled to be released in 1996, between "Chicago" (Windows 95) and "Memphis" (Windows 98, at the time scheduled for release in 1996, later 1997). Nashville was intended to be a minor release focusing on a tighter integration between Windows and Internet Explorer, in order to better compete with Netscape Navigator.

Microsoft claimed that Nashville would add Internet integration features to the Windows 95 and NT 4.0 desktop, building on the new features in the Internet Explorer 3.0 web browser (due for release a few months before Nashville). Touted features included a combined file manager and web browser, the ability to seamlessly open Microsoft Office documents from within Internet Explorer using ActiveX technology and a way to place dynamic web pages directly on the desktop in place of the regular static wallpaper.

A leaked build had version number 4.10.999 (in comparison to Windows 95's 4.00.950, Windows 95 OSR2's 4.00.1111, Windows 98's 4.10.1998, Windows 98 Second Edition's 4.10.2222 A, and Windows Me's 4.90.3000). The project was eventually cancelled as a full release of Windows, with Windows 95 OSR2 being shipped as an interim release instead. The codename "Nashville" was then reused for the Windows Desktop Update that shipped with Internet Explorer 4.0 and delivered most of the features promised for Nashville. The Athena PIM application would be released as Microsoft Internet Mail and News in 1996 along with IE3, which would later be renamed to Outlook Express in 1997 with IE4.

== See also ==
- List of Microsoft codenames
