= Microsoft Comic Chat =

Graphic IRC client by Microsoft

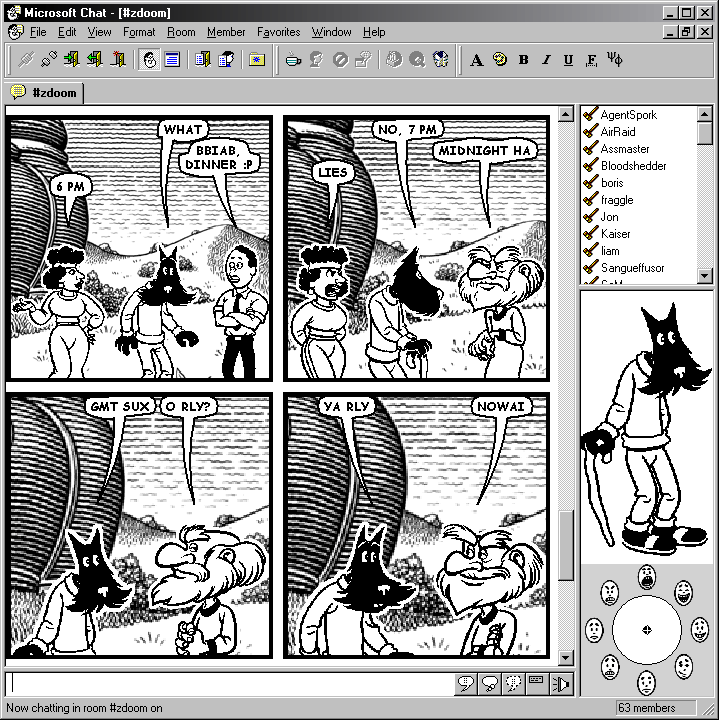
- Microsoft Chat version 2.5
- Original author: Microsoft
- Developers: David Kurlander, Microsoft Research Virtual Worlds Group
- Release: August 13, 1996; 29 years ago
- Final release: 2.5 / March 1999; 27 years ago
- Written in: C++
- Operating system: Microsoft Windows
- Platform: IA-32
- Available in: Multiple languages
- Type: IRC client
- License: Proprietary, MIT license (since July 16 2026)
- Website: microsoft.github.io/comic-chat/
- Repository: github.com/microsoft/comic-chat

Microsoft Comic Chat (later Microsoft Chat) is a graphical IRC client created by Microsoft, first released with Internet Explorer 3.0 in 1996. Comic Chat was developed by Microsoft Researcher David Kurlander, with Microsoft Research's Virtual Worlds Group and later a group he managed in Microsoft's Internet Division. On July 16, 2026, Microsoft released Comic Chat as open-source.

== Overview ==
Comic Chat's main feature, which set it apart from other IRC clients, is that it enabled comic avatars to represent a user; this character could express a specified emotion, possibly making IRC chatting a more emotive and expressive experience. All of the comic characters and backgrounds were initially created by comic artist Jim Woodring. Later, tools became available that allowed user-created characters and backgrounds.

Comic Chat started out as a research project, and a paper describing the technology was published at SIGGRAPH '96. It was an experiment in automatic illustration construction and layout. The algorithms used in Comic Chat attempted to mimic some basic illustration techniques of comic artists (particularly Jim Woodring). Character placement, the choice of gestures and expressions, and word balloon construction and layout, were all chosen automatically. A widget called the "emotion wheel" allowed users to override the program's choice of expression.

Although Comic Chat could be used in text-based chat rooms as well, it added a code at the beginning of every message to communicate the character's expression to other chat clients. This had a somewhat annoying effect on non-Comic Chat users (although it could be disabled).

Comic Chat was released with the full downloads of Internet Explorer 3, 4, and 5, as well as in the Windows 98 and Windows 2000 distributions. It also became the official chat client of MSN. It was localized into 24 different languages. Although the program can still be downloaded and still works with most IRC servers, it is infrequently used today because MSN decided to get out of the chat business, and turned off its servers.

In December 1996, The Microsoft Network introduced a show-based format, in which high quality multimedia content was produced around several themes. MSN's MotorWeb was built around an automobile theme. MSN entered into a partnership with NPR’s CarTalk, and each day featured a new online Car Talk caller from the popular NPR radio duo of "Click and Clack" (Tom and Ray Magliozzi).

Created and produced at MSN by Mike Klozar, the "Chat Show," as it was called, was an innovative combination of on-demand streaming audio, text (as cartoon bubbles) and comic strip characters all synchronized to display an animated cartoon comic strip created dynamically from the text input. An example of the show can be found at David Kurlander's project site, under [MSN CarTalk Comic Chat Show].

Each episode depicted a caller (as a black and white default character) and color caricatures of Tom & Ray interacting in a unique closed visual chat. The visuals were generated dynamically by the Comic Chat client (already residing on the PC), given a timed, textual transcript of the show. This allowed an online comic strip to draw in exact timing with the audio/dialogue that was streamed via Real Audio (14.4 modems were the norm at this time). The show ran for one year. MSN moved away from the "show" format the following year, and CarTalk signed a contract with Cars.com. The online chat show ended at that time.

Microsoft Comic Chat installed a custom font, Comic Sans MS, that users could use in other applications and documents. In 1996 it was bundled with several other fonts in Microsoft's Core Fonts for the Web project and subsequent versions of Microsoft Windows, leading to its notoriety among the digerati.

It was renamed as Microsoft Chat 2.0, and was bundled with Internet Explorer along with the then new Outlook Express, in the late 1990s. Version 2.5 bundled with Internet Explorer 5 was the last update.

Microsoft Comic Chat was removed with Internet Explorer 6.

On July 16, 2026, Microsoft announced their decision to make Comic Chat open-source under the MIT License. The software's source code was made available on GitHub, and also included patches and fixes to compile on modern systems. In their announcement of the decision, Microsoft said the purpose was "preserving an important piece of software history and giving the community an opportunity to explore, learn, and build upon it."

== See also ==
- List of IRC clients
- Comparison of Internet Relay Chat clients
- Microsoft V-Chat
