= Channel Definition Format =

XML file format

Channel Definition Format (CDF) was an XML file format formerly used in conjunction with Microsoft's Active Channel, Active Desktop and Smart Offline Favorites technologies. The format was designed to "offer frequently updated collections of information, or channels, from any web server for automatic delivery to compatible receiver programs." Active Channel allowed users to subscribe to channels and have scheduled updates delivered to their desktop. Smart Offline Favorites, like channels, enabled users to view webpages from the cache.

== History ==
Submitted to the World Wide Web Consortium (W3C) in March 1997 for consideration as a web standard, CDF marked Microsoft's attempt to capitalize on the push technology trend led by PointCast. The most notable implementation of CDF was Microsoft's Active Desktop, an optional feature introduced with the Internet Explorer 4.0 browser in September 1997. Smart Offline Favorites was introduced in Internet Explorer 5.0.

CDF prefigured aspects of the RSS file format introduced by Netscape in March 1999, and of web syndication at large. Unlike RSS, CDF was never widely adopted and its use remained very limited. As a consequence, Microsoft removed CDF support from Internet Explorer 7 in 2006.

== Example ==
A generic CDF file:

<?xml version="1.0" encoding="UTF-8"?>
<CHANNEL HREF="http://domain/folder/pageOne.extension"
  BASE="http://domain/folder/"
  LASTMOD="1998-11-05T22:12"
  PRECACHE="YES"
  LEVEL="0">
    <TITLE>Title of Channel</TITLE>
    <ABSTRACT>Synopsis of channel's contents.</ABSTRACT>
    <SCHEDULE>
      <INTERVALTIME DAY="14"/>
    </SCHEDULE>
    <LOGO HREF="wideChannelLogo.gif" STYLE="IMAGE-WIDE"/>
    <LOGO HREF="imageChannelLogo.gif" STYLE="IMAGE"/>
    <LOGO HREF="iconChannelLogo.gif" STYLE="ICON"/>
    <ITEM HREF="pageTwo.extension"
      LASTMOD="1998-11-05T22:12"
      PRECACHE="YES"
      LEVEL="1">
        <TITLE>Page Two's Title</TITLE>
        <ABSTRACT>Synopsis of Page Two's contents.</ABSTRACT>
        <LOGO HREF="pageTwoLogo.gif" STYLE="IMAGE"/>
        <LOGO HREF="pageTwoLogo.gif" STYLE="ICON"/>
    </ITEM>
</CHANNEL>

== See also ==
- Active Channel
- Active Desktop
- Push technology
- Semantic Web
- List of content syndication markup languages
- History of web syndication technology
