= Frame injection =

Arbitrary code exploit in Internet Explorer

A frame injection attack is an attack on Internet Explorer 5, Internet Explorer 6 and Internet Explorer 7 to load arbitrary code in the browser. This attack is caused by Internet Explorer not checking the destination of the resulting frame, thereby allowing arbitrary code such as JavaScript or VBScript. This also happens when code gets injected through frames due to scripts not validating their input. This other type of frame injection affects all browsers and scripts that do not validate untrusted input.
