= Microsoft V-Chat =

Freeware 3D chat program

- Microsoft V-Chat in Windows XP
- Developer: Microsoft
- Release: December 1995; 30 years ago
- Stable release: 2.0 / January 1998; 28 years ago
- Operating system: Microsoft Windows
- Platform: IA-32
- Available in: English
- Type: 3D online chat
- Website: vchat1.microsoft.com

Microsoft V-Chat is a freeware 3D chat program released in December 1995 by Microsoft. V-Chat is a multi-user social chat client that lets people interact online from within a 2D or 3D multimedia environment using graphical representations of themselves known as avatars. V-Chat avatars have a full range of gestures that allow users to fully express themselves online. V-Chat enables users to select from a wide variety of existing avatars, or create custom avatars using the V-Chat Avatar Wizard. Sounds, animations, and visual imagery create mood and context for these graphical social environments.

It has now been discontinued; it can still be downloaded from other sites, such as download.com. V-Chat was an experimental precursor to a more ambitious project called V-Worlds, which was completed but never widely deployed.

== See also ==
- Microsoft Comic Chat
