= Dynamic Data Exchange =

Data communication software

Dynamic Data Exchange (DDE) is a technology for interprocess communication used in early versions of Microsoft Windows and OS/2. DDE allows programs to manipulate objects provided by other programs, and respond to user actions affecting those objects. DDE was partially superseded by Object Linking and Embedding (OLE), and is currently maintained in Windows systems only for the sake of backward compatibility.

== History and architecture ==
Dynamic Data Exchange was first introduced in 1987 with the release of Windows 2.0 as a method of interprocess communication so that one program could communicate with or control another program, somewhat like Sun's RPC (Remote Procedure Call). At the time, the only method for communication between the operating system and client applications was the "Windows Messaging Layer." DDE extended this protocol to allow peer-to-peer communication among client applications, via message broadcasts.

Because DDE runs via message broadcasts, it is vulnerable to any window-management code that does not pump messages. This problem was not considered during the design of DDE, because DDE predates pre-emptive multitasking in Microsoft Windows.

Moreover, any code managing a window handle can respond to a DDE broadcast; the initiator of DDE must distinguish between expected and unexpected responses. DDE interlocutors usually express what information they seek in terms of hierarchical string keys. For example, a cell in Microsoft Excel was known to DDE by its "application" name. Each application could further organize information by groups known as "topic" and each topic could serve up individual pieces of data as an "item". For example, if a user wanted to pull a value from Microsoft Excel which was contained in a spreadsheet called "Book1.xls" in the cell in the first row and first column, the application would be "Excel", the topic "Book1.xls" and the item "r1c1". Internal changes in the cell due to Excel actions would then be signaled (in reverse) to the calling application via additional message broadcasts.

== Relationship to modern automation technologies ==
The common use of DDE is for custom-developed applications to control off-the-shelf software. For example, a custom in-house application might use DDE to open a Microsoft Excel spreadsheet and fill it with data, by opening a DDE conversation with Excel and sending it DDE commands. This feature has mainly been superseded by the Component Object Model (COM) suite of technologies. Microsoft has not used DDE internally since the release of Windows 95. For example, Excel now exposes an extensive OLE Automation object model, which is the recommended method for communicating with Excel. The technique is, however, still in use, particularly for distribution of financial data. Because DDE does not require more operating system components than a conventional Windows GUI program, it is also a [little-used] alternative for programs seeking to minimize their dependencies.

== NetDDE ==
Wonderware developed an extension for DDE called NetDDE that could be used to initiate and maintain the network connections needed for DDE conversations between DDE-aware applications running on different computers in a network and transparently exchange data. A DDE conversation is an interaction between client and server applications. NetDDE could be used along with DDE and the DDE management library (DDEML) in applications.

/Windows/SYSTEM32
DDESHARE.EXE (DDE Share Manager)
NDDEAPIR.EXE (NDDEAPI Server Side)
NDDENB32.DLL (Network DDE NetBIOS Interface)
NETDDE.EXE (Network DDE - DDE Communication)
The NetDDE library files

Microsoft licensed a basic (NetBIOS Frames only) version of the product for inclusion in various versions of Windows from Windows 3.1's "Windows for Workgroups" update to Windows XP. In addition, Wonderware also sold an enhanced version of NetDDE to their own customers that included support for TCP/IP. The technology is extensively used in the SCADA field. Basic Windows applications using NetDDE are ClipBook Viewer, Windows Chat and Microsoft Hearts.

NetDDE was still included with Windows Server 2003 and Windows XP Service Pack 2, although it was disabled by default. It has been removed entirely in Windows Vista. However, this will not prevent existing versions of NetDDE from being installed and functioning on later versions of Windows.

== See also ==
- ActiveX – Software framework by Microsoft introduced in 1996
- Distributed Component Object Model (DCOM) – Software for communication between software components
- Microsoft .NET strategy – Marketing plan
- Observer pattern – Software design pattern based on an event-updated object with a list of dependents

== Sources ==
- Charles Petzold. "Dynamic Data Exchange" in Programming for Windows 95. Microsoft Press.
