= Active Desktop =

Feature of Internet Explorer 4.0's Windows Desktop Update

- Developer: Microsoft
- Operating system: Microsoft Windows
- Successor: Windows Sidebar and Windows Desktop Gadgets

Active Desktop was a feature of Microsoft Internet Explorer 4.0's optional Windows Desktop Update that allowed users to add HTML content to the desktop, along with some other features. This function was intended to be installed on the then-current Windows 95 operating system. It was also included in Windows 98 and later Windows operating systems up through 32-bit XP, but was absent from XP Professional x64 Edition (for AMD64) and all subsequent versions of Windows. Its status on XP 64-bit edition (for Itanium) and on both 32-bit and 64-bit versions of Windows Server 2003 is not widely known. This corresponded to version Internet Explorer 4.0 to 6.x, but not Internet Explorer 7.

HTML could be added both in place of the regular wallpaper and as independent resizable desktop items. Items available online could be regularly updated and synchronized so users could stay updated without visiting the website in their browser.

Active Desktop worked much like desktop widget technology in that it allowed users to place customized information on their desktop.

== History ==
The introduction of the Active Desktop marked Microsoft's attempt to capitalize on the push technology trend led by PointCast.

Active Desktop allowed embedding a number of "channels" on the user's computer desktop that could provide continually-updated information such as web pages, without requiring the user to open dedicated programs such as a web browser. Example uses include overview over news headlines and stock quotes. However, its most notable feature was that it allowed Motion JPEGs and animated GIFs to animate correctly when set as the desktop wallpaper.

Active Desktop debuted as part of an Internet Explorer 4.0 preview release in July 1997, and came out with the launch of the 4.0 browser in September that year. for Windows 95 and Windows NT 4.0, as a feature of the optional Windows Desktop Update offered to users during the upgrade installation. While the Windows Desktop Update is commonly referred to (improperly) as Active Desktop itself, it is actually an entire Windows shell upgrade from v4.0 to v4.71, or v4.72, with numerous changes to the Windows interface, resulting in an appearance and functionality level nearly indistinguishable from the then yet-to-be-released Windows 98. Features include the ability to minimize foreground windows by clicking their button on the taskbar, QuickLaunch mini-buttons on the Taskbar next to the Start button, deskbands (custom toolbars on the taskbar and floating desktop toolbars), taskbands (custom toolbars in Windows Explorer and Internet Explorer), Explorer bars (a separate vertical or horizontal pane or panel in Windows Explorer and Internet Explorer), an upgraded Start Menu allowing drag and drop item reordering and allowing right-click context menus for item renaming option, allowing uppercase filenames (the old v4.0 desktop would forcibly display uppercase filenames in title case), configurable one-click hot-tracking file selection, customizable per-folder HTML display settings, etc. With the update, Windows Explorer featured an Address bar in which Internet addresses can be entered and seamlessly browsed.

Since Windows XP, if a non-BMP image is used as Windows Desktop wallpaper, Windows will convert non-BMP image to BMP image in background.

Active Desktop never attained any significant degree of popularity, as its drawbacks included high use of system resources and reduced system stability. The component was retained in Windows XP but was replaced by a feature named Windows Sidebar in Windows Vista. Sidebar in turn was called Windows Desktop Gadgets in Windows 7, which also allows components to be added to the desktop, but it was also discontinued due to security issues. Windows 8 (also 8.1 and 10) partially replaced their functionality with "live tiles" in the Start screen (or Start menu). Finally, such functionalities have now been partially replaced with Widgets in Windows 11. Windows Server 2003 R2 32-bit is the most recent Microsoft operating system to support Active Desktop. It appears that the 64-bit version of Windows XP no longer supports Active Desktop. However, it still provides the option to display Web pages and channels built with Microsoft's Channel Definition Format (CDF) on the desktop.

The HTML displaying capabilities are now mainly used for creating original wallpapers and adding search boxes to the desktop. For example, a user could copy the following code to display Wikipedia's search-box on the desktop:

<form
    action="http://en.wikipedia.org/wiki/Special:Search"
    id="searchform"
    name="searchform">
  <input
      accesskey="f"
      id="searchInput"
      name="search"
      type="text"
      value="" />
  <input
      id="searchGoButton"
      name="go"
      type="submit"
      value="Go" />
</form>

== See also ==
- Active Channel
- Channel Definition Format

== Sources ==
- Getting Started: Microsoft Windows 98. Microsoft. 1998.
