= Internet Explorer 4 =

Web browser for Windows released in 1997

- Screenshot of Internet Explorer 4
- Developer: Microsoft
- Release: Windows: September 22, 1997; 29 years ago; Mac OS: January 6, 1998; 28 years ago; Unix: March 4, 1998; 28 years ago
- Stable release: Windows: 4.01 SP2 (4.72.3612.1713) / March 16, 1999; 27 years ago; Mac OS: 4.5
- Engine: MSHTML
- Operating system: Windows 3.1; Windows NT 3.51; Windows 95; Windows NT 4.0 SP3 or later; Mac OS 7.1 or later; Solaris; HP-UX
- Platform: x86, 68k (Up to 4.5), PPC, Alpha AXP, PA-RISC, and SPARC
- Included with: Windows 95 OSR 2.5; Windows 98
- Predecessor: Internet Explorer 3 (1996)
- Successor: Internet Explorer 5 (1999)
- Type: Web browser
- License: Proprietary
- Website: Internet Explorer 4 (archived at Wayback Machine)

Microsoft Internet Explorer 4 (IE4) is the fourth version of the Internet Explorer graphical web browser that Microsoft unveiled in Spring of 1997, and released on September 22, 1997, primarily for Microsoft Windows, but also with versions available for the classic Mac OS, Solaris, and HP-UX and marketed as "The Web the Way You Want It".

It was one of the main participants of the first browser war. Its distribution methods and Windows integration were involved in the United States v. Microsoft Corp. case. It was superseded by Internet Explorer 5 in March 1999. In addition the Internet Explorer layout engine MSHTML (Trident) was introduced. It attained just over 60% market share by March 1999 when IE5 was released. In August 2001 when Internet Explorer 6 was released, IE4.x had dropped to 7% market share and IE5 had increased to 80%. IE4 market share dropped under 1% by 2004.

Internet Explorer 4 is no longer available for download from Microsoft. However, archived versions of the software can be found on various websites.

== Overview ==
Internet Explorer 4 retail box.

The Internet Explorer 4.0 Platform Preview was released in April 1997, and Platform Preview 2.0 in July that year. Internet Explorer 4 was released to the public on September 22, 1997, and deepened the level of integration between the web browser and the underlying operating system. Installing version 4 and choosing "Windows Desktop Update" would result in the traditional Windows Explorer being replaced by a version more akin to a web browser interface, as well as the Windows desktop itself being web-enabled via Active Desktop. The integration with Windows, however, was subject to numerous packaging criticisms (see United States v. Microsoft Corp.). This option was no longer available with the installers for later versions of Internet Explorer but was not removed from the system if already installed. Internet Explorer 4 introduced support for Group Policy, allowing companies to configure and lock down many aspects of the browser's configuration. Internet Mail and News was replaced with Outlook Express, and Microsoft Chat and an improved NetMeeting were also included. Version 4.5 (only for Mac) dropped support for 68k Macs, but offered new features such as easier 128-bit encryption. The last non-Mac version was 4.0 Service Pack 2. Uninstalling IE4 became the subject of concern to some users and was a point of contention in later lawsuits (see Removal of Internet Explorer and United States v. Microsoft Corp..)

=== Internet Explorer version 4.0 for Macintosh ===
On January 6, 1998, at the Macworld Expo in San Francisco, Microsoft announced the release of the final version of Internet Explorer version 4.0 for Macintosh. Version 4 includes support for offline browsing, Dynamic HTML, a new faster Java virtual machine and Security Zones that allow users or administrators to limit access to certain types of web content depending on which zone (for example Intranet or Internet) the content is coming from. At the same event, Apple announced the release of Mac OS 8.1, which would be bundled with IE4.

At the following year's San Francisco Macworld Expo on January 9, 1999, Microsoft announced the release of Internet Explorer 4.5 Macintosh Edition. This new version dropped 68K processor support, introduced Form AutoFill, Print Preview, and Page Holder pane, which allowed user to hold a page of links on one side of the screen that opens pages in the right hand and support for Mac OS technology like Sherlock.

=== Internet Explorer 4 for Unix ===
Internet Explorer 4 for Solaris

On November 5, 1997, a beta of IE for Unix 4.0 was released for testing on Solaris. On January 27, 1998, it was reported that IE 4.0 for Solaris was due in March; Tod Nielsen, general manager of Microsoft's developer relations group, joked that "he wanted to launch Internet Explorer 4.0 for Unix at the Ripley's Believe It or Not! museum in San Francisco" because of skepticism from those who suspected IE for Unix was vaporware. It was further reported that versions for "HP-UX, IBM AIX, and Irix" were planned. The software used to enable this, MainWin XDE, was available for Solaris 2.5.1 on SPARC and Intel, SunOS 4.1.4, Irix 5.3, Irix 6.2, HP UX 10.2, and IBM AIX 4.1.5. On March 4, 1998, IE 4.0 for Unix on Solaris was released. Later that year, a version for HP-UX was released.

== Features, technology, and integrated software ==
IE4 came with Active Desktop, Windows Desktop Update, Channels, Frontpage Express, Netmeeting, NetShow, Web Publishing Wizard, Microsoft Chat 2.0 and Progressive Networks RealPlayer. Outlook Express 4 replaced Internet Mail and News.

Other new features including Dynamic HTML, inline PNG, Favicons, a parental rating system, and the ability to 'subscribe' to a website in favorites, where it would notify the user of an update. Stephen Reid of PC Pro noted in his review:

But it was the Web-style view that surprised me so much on first using IE 4. This changes the way you look at Windows, with files and folders now acting like hyperlinks on a Web page; you move your cursor over them to select them, then single click to launch. Individual folders are viewed as Web pages, including My Computer and Control Panel, and any folder you wish can be customised with your choice of background.

=== Bundled and/or integrated software ===
- Microsoft Chat 2.0 is a simple text chatting program included in the Windows NT-line of operating system. It utilizes NetBIOS session service and NetDDE.
- Outlook Express is the successor of Microsoft Internet Mail and News, an early e-mail client add-on for Internet Explorer 3. Internet Mail and News handled only plain text and rich text (RTF) e-mail, it lacked HTML email. Despite being versioned 4.0, Outlook Express was at its first iteration.
- NetMeeting is a VoIP and multi-point videoconferencing client that uses the H.323 protocol for video and audio conferencing.
- FrontPage Express 2.0 was a stripped-down version of Microsoft FrontPage. It was bundled with Internet Explorer 4, but was also available for free, and could be downloaded from online repositories.
- RealPlayer was a streaming media player made by Progressive Networks (later called RealNetworks). The first version of RealPlayer was introduced in April 1995 as RealAudio Player and was one of the first media players capable of streaming media over the Internet.

=== Active Desktop ===
Active Desktop is a feature of Internet Explorer's optional Windows Desktop Update that allows the user to add HTML content to the desktop, along with some other features. Active Desktop placed many "channels" on the user's computer desktop that provided continually-updated information, such as news headlines and stock quotes, without requiring the user to open a web browser.

=== Channels ===
Active Channel is a website type which allows synchronizing website content and viewing it offline. It makes use of the Channel Definition Format, which is a way of defining a website's content and structure. Each country had different channels, so picking a country during the installation of IE 4 was important. Channels could be displayed in a Channel Bar and made heavy use of Dynamic HTML.

=== Windows Desktop Update ===
Windows Desktop Update was an optional feature included with Internet Explorer 4, which provided several updated shell features for older versions of Microsoft Windows. The Windows Desktop Update also added the ability to create desk-bands like the quicklaunch bar. It also updated the Windows file manager, explorer.exe (also a shell), to be more modular and extensible.

=== MSHTML ===
MSHTML (Trident) was a layout engine introduced with IE4. It was designed as a software component to allow software developers to easily add web browsing functionality to their own applications. It presents a COM interface for accessing and editing web pages in any COM-supported environment, like C++ and .NET. For instance, the WebBrowser control can be added to a C++ program and MSHTML can then be used to access the page currently displayed in the web browser and retrieve element values. Events from the WebBrowser control can also be captured. MSHTML functionality becomes available by connecting the file mshtml.dll to the software project.

=== Browser Helper Object ===
A Browser Helper Object (BHO) is a DLL module designed as a plugin for Internet Explorer 4.0, and provides added functionality. Most BHOs are loaded once by each new instance of Internet Explorer.

=== Others ===
Internet Explorer 4 is one of the earliest browsers to support UCS-2 and UTF-8.

== System requirements ==
=== Adoption capability overview ===
IE4 supported 68k Macs, although this was dropped in Internet Explorer 4.5.

=== Windows ===
For Windows, 16MB of RAM, 11MB of disk space (minimum for install). The 16-bit version required a 486, 12 MB of RAM (or 16 MB for Java support), and 25 MB of disk space.

=== Mac ===
System Requirements for initial release of 4.0 for Mac:

- Macintosh with 68030 or higher processor
- System 7.1 or higher
- 8 MB of RAM with virtual memory on (12 MB recommended)
- 12 MB of hard disk space for IE4 and 8.5 MB of hard disk space for Java VM.
- Open Transport 1.1.1 or higher or MacTCP 2.0.6 or, Config PPP or similar PPP connection software (Control Panel) with PPP (Extension).

IE 4.5 did not support 68k Macs.

== Encryption ==
Internet Explorer 4 was the first version of the browser to support TLS 1.0. Internet Explorer 4 supported 40-bit and later 128-bit encryption through an add-on, using Server Gated Cryptography (SGC). A 256-bit encryption would not become available in IE for nearly 10 years.

128-bit encryption was available or included for these versions:

- Internet Explorer 4.5 for Macintosh
- Internet Explorer 4.5 128-Bit Edition
- Internet Explorer 4.01
- Internet Explorer 4.0 for Unix
- Internet Explorer 4.01 Service Pack 2
- Internet Explorer 4.0 for Macintosh
- Internet Explorer 4.0 128-Bit Edition

If it is not possible to upgrade to 128-bit, then 40-bit (SGC) is standard.

== Versions ==
=== Versions overview ===
Mac OS:

- Version 4.0 – January 6, 1998
- Version 4.5 – January 5, 1999

Version number	Release date	Significant changes	Shipped with	Shdocvw.dll version
4.0 Beta 1	April 1997	Improved support of CSS and Microsoft DOM.		4.71.544
4.0 Beta 2	July 1997	Improved support of HTML and CSS.		4.71.1008.3
4.0	September 22, 1997	Final release.	Windows 95 OSR 2.5	4.71.1712.6
4.01	November 18, 1997	Bug fix release.	Windows NT 4.0 Terminal Server Edition	4.72.2106.8
4.01 SP1	May 15, 1998	Vulnerability patch.	Windows 98	4.72.3110.8
4.01 SP2	March 16, 1999	Vulnerability patch.		4.72.3612.1713

=== Comparison of features across platforms ===
Table of features across platforms
Feature	Windows 95, NT 4.0, 98	Windows 3.1, NT 3.51	Mac OS	Unix
Active Desktop	Yes	No	No	
Autocomplete	Yes	No	Yes	
Active Channel	Yes	Yes	Yes	
Microsoft Chat 2.x	Yes	No	No	
Dynamic HTML	Yes	Yes	Yes	
DirectX	Yes	No	No	
Explorer bars	Yes	Yes	Yes	
FrontPage Express	Yes	No	No	
Internet Connection	Yes	Yes	Yes	
Internet Mail and News	Yes	Yes	Yes	
JavaScript	Yes	Yes	Yes	
NetMeeting	Yes	No	No	
NetShow	Yes	Yes	No	
Outlook Express	Yes	No	Yes	
Personal Web Server	Yes	No	Yes	
RealAudio	Yes	Yes	Yes	
Security Zones	Yes	Yes	Yes	
Shockwave	Yes	Yes	Yes	
TrueType Fonts	Yes	Yes	Yes	
Wallet	Yes	Yes	Yes	
Web Publishing Wizard	Yes	No	No	
Source:Sweet, Steven. "Internet Explorer for Any System". PC Novice. 6 (9): 23. Archived from the original on 2012-03-10.

== See also ==
- History of the Internet
- United States v. Microsoft Corp.
- Comparison of web browsers
- Timeline of web browsers

Preceded by Internet Explorer 3	Internet Explorer 4; 1997	Succeeded by Internet Explorer 5
