= Active Channel =

Internet Explorer website viewing technology

Active Channel was a technology introduced by Internet Explorer 4.0 in 1997. It allowed synchronizing website content and viewing it offline. It made use of the Channel Definition Format, which was designed to "offer frequently updated collections of information, or channels, from any web server for automatic delivery to compatible receiver programs."

== History ==
Microsoft unveiled the Active Channel component as part of an Internet Explorer 4.0 preview release in July 1997, and brought out the final version with the launch of the 4.0 browser in September that year.

Most Active Channels were provided by bigger entertainment and news companies like Disney, Warner Bros., or AOL, and also made heavy use of DHTML (Dynamic HTML). Channel defaults varied by country/region, and were controlled by the choice of country/region during the installation of Internet Explorer 4 (and therefore Windows 98). Channels could be displayed in a Channel Bar.

Active Channel support was removed from Internet Explorer in version 7, as it had been superseded by the more popular and standards-based RSS format.

== See also ==
- Active Desktop
- Channel Definition Format
- Web Slice
