= Windows Desktop Update =

Optional feature included with Internet Explorer 4

Windows Desktop Update was an optional feature by Microsoft that was included with Internet Explorer 4 (IE4, released in September 1997), which introduced several updated shell features to the Windows 95 and Windows NT 4.0 operating systems. These features later became part of the standard installation in their successors, which were Windows 98 and Windows 2000, respectively.

The Windows Desktop Update included features such as Active Desktop and tight IE4 integration with the Windows Explorer. It was downloadable as part of IE4 for all versions of Windows 95 except for Windows 95 OEM Service Release 2.5 (4.00.950C), which included a standalone version of IE 4.0 plus the Windows Desktop Update (but not slipstreamed) where it was automatically installed after the standard Windows 95 set-up. Similarly, the shell update was also made available as part of IE 4.0 for Windows NT 4.0 (with Service Pack 3 or later).

While the Windows Desktop Update was officially only an optional user component under Internet Explorer 4.0 releases and was not formally included in later versions of Internet Explorer, users can extract the Windows Desktop Update installer from the IE4 setup files using standard .CAB extraction tools or use IEAK to generate a version of the IE 5.0x, 5.5 or 6.0 setup which included the update. Also, command line parameters or edits to a temporary configuration file can be used to instruct installer of those versions of IE to install the Desktop Update.

For example, in the case of IE 5.0x and 5.5, the IE5 setup will install some new shell features if the Windows Desktop Update is installed, such as sorting by name in a context menu and drop down/overflow menu buttons whenever menus or toolbar buttons did not fit in the Explorer window on the screen.

== Key features ==
Example of before and after installing Windows Desktop Update in Windows 95 OSR1
Windows 95 OSR1 Desktop without the Windows Desktop Update, prior to installing Internet Explorer 4

Windows 95 OSR1 Desktop with the Windows Desktop Update, after installing Internet Explorer 4. Note that the Active Desktop, the Channel Guide, the Quick Launch bar and Web View are present. These features later became available by default in its successor, Windows 98.
- Active Desktop - Enables the display of Internet Explorer-rendered web content (e.g. HTML, XML, CDF) and for the first time the displaying of non-BMP image content on the Windows Desktop
- Active Channels Channel bar - Push Technology with some similarities to RSS and IE 8's WebSlices. Channels are an XML scripted remote delivery service over http using the .cdf file format. Internet Explorer 4.0 installs of the Desktop Update included localized content and service providers for the main language regions. Installations against IE 5.0 and higher lacked any default subscription content.
- Quick Launch - The Quick Launch bar first appeared in the Desktop Update, providing a horizontal alternative to Microsoft Office 95/97/2000's vertical launch bar
- Web folders - A WebDAV client integrated into Explorer windows which could display web content and graphics, providing a richer Windows Explorer experience
- Folder Customization - Individual folders and groups of folders could be customized in appearance using web like formatting constraints
- Larger toolbar buttons with text labels in Windows Explorer
- Improved Start menu, including a new 'Favorites' section, more options on the 'Find' menu and menu item drag and drop, edit and delete support
- Support for displaying thumbnail image previews in Windows Explorer and infotips/tooltips for files and folders stored as comments in Desktop.ini.

== Updates ==
Updates to the Windows Desktop Update were part of IE 4.0 hotfixes and service packs. Later, shell security updates for Windows 95 and Windows NT 4.0 included both the update to the Windows Desktop Update version and the original version. Sometimes the Windows Desktop Update version and the update to the original version were packaged separately.

The Windows Desktop Update also added the ability to create desk-bands like the Quick Launch bar. It also introduced new extensibility APIs for the Windows Explorer.

== See also ==
- Windows Nashville
