= PointCast =

Defunct American dot-com company

- Industry: Software Development
- Founded: 1992; 34 years ago in Sunnyvale, California, United States
- Founder: Christopher R. Hassett
- Defunct: 2000
- Fate: Acquired by Launchpad Technologies

PointCast was a dot-com company founded in 1992 by Christopher R. Hassett in Sunnyvale, California. It was a pioneer in the use of internet push technology, providing news updates to user's computer screens.

== PointCast Network ==
The company's initial product was a screensaver that displayed news and other information, delivered live over the Internet. The PointCast Network used push technology, which was a new concept at the time, and received enormous press coverage when it launched in beta form on February 13, 1996.

The product did not perform as well as expected, often believed to be because its traffic burdened corporate networks with excessive bandwidth use, and was banned in many places. It demanded more bandwidth than the home dial-up Internet connections of the day could provide, and people objected to the large number of advertisements that were pushed over the service as well. PointCast offered corporations a proxy server that would dramatically reduce the bandwidth used, but even this didn't help save the company.

The increasing popularity of "portal websites" also accelerated the demise of PointCast. When PointCast first started, Yahoo offered little more than a hierarchical structure on the Internet (broken down by subject much like DMOZ), but was soon to introduce customizable news and content and offered a much more convenient way to read about the specific topics of interest to the user.

== News Corporation purchase offer and change of CEO ==
At its height in January 1997, News Corporation made an offer of $450 million to purchase the company. However, the offer was withdrawn in March. While there were rumors that it was withdrawn due to issues with the price and revenue projections, James Murdoch said it was due to PointCast's inaction.

Shortly after not accepting the purchase offer, the board of directors decided to replace Christopher Hassett as the CEO. Some reasons included turning down the recent purchase offer, software performance problems (using too much corporate bandwidth) and declining market share (lost to the then-emerging Web portal sites.) After five months, David Dorman was chosen as the new CEO. In an effort to raise more capital, Dorman planned to take the company public. A filing was made in May 1998 with a valuation of $250 million. This plan was abandoned after two months in favor of looking for a company with whom to partner or be acquired.

== Project Newnet ==
In August 1998, PointCast found such a partner. In order to compete with @Home, a consortium of telephone companies and Microsoft put together a project designed to promote use of DSL in preference to cable modems. The project was dubbed "Newnet" and the plan was to use PointCast's software as a portal for the service. The consortium planned to buy PointCast for $100 million as part of the deal. The deal was signed in December 1998 with the intent of launching the service in April 1999.

Due to delays in the project, Dorman resigned as CEO in March 1999. Two weeks later, PointCast was informed that their planned acquisition had been scrapped. In the reorganization that followed, 75 of the 220 employees were let go in an effort to reduce costs. A number of bids were made to buy the company, including two from former CEO Christopher Hassett, which were rejected.

Instead, they sold out for about $7 million in May 1999 to Launchpad Technologies, Inc., a San Diego company founded and backed by Idealab, and the PointCast network was shut down the next year.

== EntryPoint ==
Launchpad's eWallet product was combined with the existing PointCast technology to create EntryPoint, which had a free desktop toolbar and offered customized news, stocks and sports feeds.

== Infogate ==
EntryPoint merged with Internet Financial Network in 2000 forming Infogate, continuing the same free service until switching to a fee-based co-branded model, partnering with news outlets such as USA Today and CNN. Infogate was sold to AOL Time Warner in March 2003. Infogate senior executives Cliff Boro, Vidar Vignisson, and Tom Broadhead formed CVT Ventures, LLC, a venture-development group dedicated to accelerating technology startups.
