= Internet Explorer 5 =

Web browser for Windows released in 1999

- Screenshot of Internet Explorer 5
- Developer: Microsoft
- Release: March 18, 1999; 27 years ago
- Stable release: 5.5 Service Pack 2 (5.50.4807.2300) / July 23, 2001; 25 years ago
- Engine: MSHTML
- Operating system: Windows 3.1; Windows NT 3.51; Windows 95; Windows NT 4.0 SP3 or later; Windows 98; Mac OS X (up to v5.2.3); Classic Mac OS (up to v5.1.7); Solaris; HP-UX (up to 5.01 SP1)
- Included with: Windows 98 SE; Windows 2000; Windows ME
- Predecessor: Internet Explorer 4 (1997)
- Successor: Internet Explorer 6 (2001)
- License: Proprietary software
- Website: Internet Explorer 5 (archived at Wayback Machine)

Microsoft Internet Explorer 5 (IE5) is the fifth version of the Internet Explorer graphical web browser, released on March 18, 1999. It was the successor to Internet Explorer 4 and one of the main participants of the first browser war. Its distribution methods and Windows integration were involved in the United States v. Microsoft Corp. case. Although Internet Explorer 5 ran only on Windows, its siblings Internet Explorer for Mac 5 and Internet Explorer for UNIX 5 supported Mac OS X, Solaris, and HP-UX.

IE5 presided over a large market share increase over Netscape Navigator between 1999 and 2001, and offered many advanced features for its day. In addition, it was compatible with the largest range of OSes of all the IE versions. However, support for many OSes quickly dropped off with later patches, and later Windows versions are not supported, because of inclusion of later IE versions. The 1999 review in PC World noted, "Credit the never-ending game of browser one-upsmanship that Netscape and Microsoft play. The new IE 5 trumps Netscape Communicator with smarter searching and accelerated browsing."

IE5 attained over 50% market share by early 2000, taking the lead over other browser versions including IE4 and Netscape. 5.x versions attained over 80% market share by the release of IE6 in August 2001. 5.0x and 5.5 were surpassed by Internet Explorer 6.0, dropping it to the second most popular browser, with market share dropping to 34 percent by mid-2003. In addition, Firefox 1.0 had overtaken it in market share by early 2005. Market share of IE5 fell below 1% by the end of 2006, right when Internet Explorer 7 was released.

Microsoft spent over US$100 million a year in the late 1990s, with over 1000 people working on IE by 1999 during the development of IE5.

The rendering behavior of Internet Explorer 5.x lives on in other browsers' quirks modes. Internet Explorer 5 is no longer available for download from Microsoft.

It is the last version of Internet Explorer to run on Windows 3.1, Windows NT 3.51, Windows 95 and Windows NT 4.0 SP3 through SP6.

== History ==
Usage share of Internet Explorer 5 rose rapidly between its release in early 1999 to being replaced by IE6 in mid-2001. Graph from 1994 to 2024 for all versions of IE.

The actual release of Internet Explorer 5 happened in three stages. First, a Developer Preview was released in June 1998 (5.0B1), and then a Public Preview was released in November 1998 (5.0B2). Then in March 1999 the final release was released (5.0). Version 5.01, a bug fix version, was released in December 1999. Internet Explorer 5 Macintosh Edition had been released a few months earlier on March 27, 2000, and was the final version of Internet Explorer to be released on a MacOS platform. Version 5.5 for Windows was released in June 2000, bundled with 128-bit encryption. It dropped support for several older Windows versions.

A 1999 review of IE5 by Paul Thurrott described IE5 in ways such as, "Think of IE 5.0 as IE 4.0 done right: All of the rough areas have been smoothed out..", "....comes optionally bundled with a full suite of Internet applications that many people are going to find irresistible.", "IE 5.0 is a world-class suite of Internet applications."

Microsoft ended all support for Internet Explorer 5.5 SP2, including security updates, on December 31, 2005. Microsoft continued to support Internet Explorer 5.01 SP4, according to its Support Lifecycle Policy; however, this support was ended on July 13, 2010.

=== Overview ===
Internet Explorer 5 on Solaris (CDE)

Version 5.0, launched on March 18, 1999, and subsequently bundled with Microsoft Office 2000, was a significant release that supported bi-directional text, ruby characters, XML, XSLT and the ability to save web pages in MHTML format. There was enhanced support for CSS Level 1 and 2, and a side bar for web searches was introduced, allowing quick jumps throughout results.

However, Internet Explorer 5 incorrectly includes the padding and borders within a specified width or height; this results in a narrower or shorter rendering of a box. The bug was fixed in Internet Explorer 6 when running in standards-compliant mode.

With the release of Internet Explorer 5.0, Microsoft released the first version of XMLHttpRequest (XHR), giving birth to Ajax (even though the term "Ajax" was not coined until years later.) XMLHttpRequest is an API that can be used by JavaScript, and other Web browser scripting languages to transfer XML and other text data between a page's client side and server side, and was available since the introduction of Internet Explorer 5.0 and is accessible via JScript, VBScript and other scripting languages supported by IE browsers. Windows Script Host was also installed with IE5, although later on viruses and malware would attempt to use this ability as an exploit, which resulted pressure to disable it for security reasons. Smart Offline Favorites feature was added to the Active Desktop component introduced in IE4.

An "HTML Application" (HTA) is a Microsoft Windows application written with HTML and Dynamic HTML and introduced with IE5. Internet Explorer 5.0 also introduced favicon support and Windows Script Host, which provides scripting capabilities comparable to batch files, but with a greater range of supported features.

Because of United States v. Microsoft Corp., The Active Channels Channel Bar was removed in Internet Explorer 5.

Version 5.5 followed in June 2000. First released to developers at the 2000 Professional Developers Conference in Orlando, Florida, then made available for download; it focused on improved print preview capabilities, CSS and HTML standards support, and developer APIs. It also includes support for 128-bit encryption. Although it is no longer available for download from Microsoft directly, it can also be installed with MSN Explorer 6.0 as msnsetup_full.exe. The full version of MSN Explorer can be downloaded only if Internet Explorer 5.5 has not yet been installed. The full version will work but a user will need to download it on earlier Windows versions and transfer the setup file to the newer operating system. If a user still want to download it on a newer operating system, the only way is to use an outdated web browser such as Netscape 4.8.

Although newer browsers have been released, IE5 rendering mode continues to have an impact, as a 2008 Ars Technica article notes:

IE5.5 (and below) was decidedly nonstandard in its rendering behavior. Hundreds of millions of web pages were written to look "right" in IE5.5's broken rendering. The result was something of a quandary for Microsoft when it came to release IE6. They wanted to improve the standards conformance in IE6, but could not afford to break pages dependent on the older behavior.

The solution was the "doctype switch". The doctype switch allowed IE6 to support both the old IE5.5 behavior—"quirks mode"—and new, more standards-conforming behavior—"standards mode."

=== United States v. Microsoft Corp. ===
On April 3, 2000, Judge Jackson issued his findings of fact that Microsoft had abused its monopoly position by attempting to "dissuade Netscape from developing Navigator as a platform", that it "withheld crucial technical information", and attempted to reduce Navigator's usage share by "giving Internet Explorer away and rewarding firms that helped build its usage share" and "excluding Navigator from important distribution channels".

Jackson also released a remedy that suggested Microsoft should be broken up into two companies. This remedy was overturned on appeal, amidst charges that Jackson had revealed a bias against Microsoft in communication with reporters. The findings of fact that Microsoft had broken the law, however, were upheld. The Department of Justice announced on September 6, 2001 that it was no longer seeking to break up Microsoft and would instead seek a lesser antitrust penalty. Several months later the Department of Justice agreed on a settlement agreement with Microsoft.

== Major features ==
IE5 introduced many new or improved features:

- Web Page, Complete
- Web Archive (MHTML) (only with Microsoft Outlook Express 5)
- Language Encoding (new options such as Install On Demand)
- History Explorer Bar (new search and sort options)
- Search Explorer Bar (new options for searching)
- Favorites (make available offline)
- AutoComplete Feature
- Windows Radio Bar Toolbar
- Ability to set a default HTML Editor
- Internet Explorer Repair Tool
- FTP Folders allows browsing of FTP and Web-Based Folders from Windows Explorer. (see Shell extension)
- Approved Sites (PICS not required for listed sites option)
- Hotmail Integration
- There was also an Internet Explorer 5 Resource Kit
- Compatibility Option allowed Internet Explorer 4 to be run side by side with IE 5, although IE 5.5 would be the final version with this feature.
- XMLHTTPRequest support via ActiveX, making IE 5 the earliest AJAX-capable browser

=== Bundled software ===
IE5 for Windows came with Windows Media Player 6.0 (with new Real Audio codecs), NetMeeting 2.11, Chat 2.5 and FrontPage Express 2.0. Other optional installs included Offline Browsing Pack, Internet Explorer Core Web Fonts, and Visual Basic Scripting (VBScript) support. Internet Explorer versions 5.0 and 5.5 are no longer available from Microsoft.

== System and hardware requirements ==
=== Adoption capability overview ===
IE 5.01 SP2 is the last version to run on Windows 3.1 and Windows NT 3.51. Support was dropped after that, as well as HP-UX, Solaris, the classic Mac OS, and Mac OS X. IE 5.5 SP2 is the last version to run on Windows 95 and Windows NT 4.0 SP3 through SP6. It was not developed for 68k Macs, support for which had been dropped in Internet Explorer 4.5.

=== Windows software ===
- Windows 32-bit versions
- Windows 16-bit versions
- Note: Although NT 3.51 is a 32-bit platform, it must run the 16-bit version of Internet Explorer.
- UNIX, including Sun Solaris 2.5.1, Sun Solaris 2.6, and Hewlett Packard HP-UX

=== PC hardware ===
- Internet Explorer 5.0 for 32-bit Windows Operating Systems
  - Minimum Requirements: 486DX/66 MHz or higher, Windows 95, 12MB RAM, 56MB disk space.
  - Download Size: 37 MB
  - There was also a 380 KB active installer that only downloaded selected components
- Internet Explorer 5.0 for 16-bit Windows Operating Systems
  - Minimum Requirements: 486DX or higher, Windows 3.1 or NT 3.5, 12 MB RAM for browser only installation (16 MB RAM if using the Java VM). 30 MB disk space to run setup.
  - Download Size: 9.4 MB

=== Apple Macintosh ===
Internet Explorer 5 for Apple Macintosh requirements:

- PowerPC processor
- Mac OS version 7.6.1 or later
- 8 MB RAM plus Virtual Memory
- 12 MB hard disk space
- QuickTime 3.0 or later
- Open Transport 1.2 or later

== Versions ==
Internet Explorer for Windows
Version number	Release date	Significant changes	Shipped with
5.0 Beta 1	June 2, 1998	Support of more CSS2 features	—N/a
5.0 Beta 2	November 15, 1998	Support of bi-directional text, ruby character, XML/XSL and more CSS properties	—N/a
5.0	March 18, 1999	Final release.	Windows 98 SE
5.01	November 8, 1999	Bug fix release.	Windows 2000
5.01 SP1	August 15, 2000	Vulnerability patch.	Windows 2000 SP1
5.01 SP2	May 16, 2001	Vulnerability patch. Last version for Windows 3.1 and Windows NT 3.51.	Windows 2000 SP2
5.01 SP3	August 29, 2002	Vulnerability patch.	Windows 2000 SP3
5.01 SP4	June 26, 2003	Latest updates included with 2000 SP4.	Windows 2000 SP4
5.5 Beta 1	December 25, 1999	Support of more CSS properties and minor changes to support of frames	Windows Neptune
5.5	June 19, 2000	Final release.	Windows ME
5.5 SP1	October 20, 2000	Vulnerability patch.	—N/a
5.5 SP2	July 23, 2001	Vulnerability patch. Last version for Windows 95.	—N/a
5.6	August 18, 2000	Released for Windows Whistler build 2257.	Windows Whistler

Early versions of Mac OS X shipped with Internet Explorer for Mac v5.1 as the default web browser, only until Mac OS X 10.3, where the default web browser in Mac OS X Panther is Safari.

== See also ==
- Browser timeline
- Comparison of web browsers
- History of the Internet

Preceded by Internet Explorer 4	Internet Explorer 5; 1999	Succeeded by Internet Explorer 6
