= Microsoft Windows =

Computer operating system

Windows
- Developer: Microsoft
- Source model: Closed-source; Source-available (through Shared Source Initiative)
- Initial release: November 20, 1985; 40 years ago
- Latest release: Windows 11 26H1 (10.0.28000.3501) (November 10, 2026; 9 days ago) [±] 26H2 (10.0.26300.9974) (November 10, 2026; 9 days ago) [±]
- Latest preview: Release Preview: 26H2 (10.0.26300.9974) (November 10, 2026; 9 days ago) [±]; Release Preview (26H1): (10.0.28000.3501) (November 10, 2026; 9 days ago) [±]; Beta: 26H2 (10.0.26320.9876) (November 6, 2026; 13 days ago) [±]; Beta (26H1): (10.0.28020.3445) (November 6, 2026; 13 days ago) [±]; Experimental: 26H2 (10.0.26340.9882) (November 6, 2026; 13 days ago) [±]; Experimental (26H1): (10.0.28120.3454) (November 6, 2026; 13 days ago) [±]; Experimental (Future Platforms): (10.0.29704.1000) (November 6, 2026; 13 days ago) [±]
- Marketing target: Personal computing
- Available in: 110 languages
- Update method: Windows Update; Microsoft Store; Windows Server Update Services (WSUS)
- Package manager: Windows Installer (.msi, .msp), App Installer (.msix. msixbundle), Microsoft Store (.appx, .appxbundle), Windows Package Manager
- Supported platforms: IA-32, x86-64, ARM, ARM64; Previously: 16-bit x86, DEC Alpha, MIPS, PowerPC, Itanium
- Kernel type: Windows NT family: Hybrid; Windows Embedded Compact/Windows CE: Hybrid or Monolithic; Windows 9x and earlier: Monolithic (MS-DOS and VMM32)
- Default user interface: Windows shell
- License: Proprietary commercial software
- Official website: windows.com

Windows is a proprietary operating system developed by Microsoft. Windows is grouped into families that cater to particular sectors of the computing industry – Windows for personal computers, Windows Server for servers, and Windows IoT for embedded systems. Windows itself is further grouped into editions that cater to different users – Home for home users, Professional for advanced users, Education for schools, and Enterprise for corporations. Windows is sold both as a consumer retail product and to computer manufacturers, who bundle and distribute it with their systems.

The first version of Windows, Windows 1.0, was released on November 20, 1985 as a graphical operating system shell for MS-DOS in response to growing interest in graphical user interfaces (GUIs). The name Windows is a reference to the windowing system in GUIs. The 1990 release of Windows 3.0 catapulted its market success and led to the launch of various other product families, including the (now-defunct) Windows Mobile, Windows Phone, and Windows CE/Embedded Compact.

Windows is the most popular desktop operating system in the world, with a 77% market share as of October 2026, and the second-most popular operating system overall, behind Android. As of October 2026, Windows 11 is the most used desktop version of Windows, with a market share of 74%.

== Product line ==
All members of the Windows product family are, as of 2026, based on Windows NT. The first version of Windows in that product line, Windows NT 3.1, was intended for server computing and corporate workstations. It now consists of four sub-families that tend to be released almost simultaneously and share the same kernel.

- Windows (unqualified): For a consumer or corporate workstation or tablet. The latest version is Windows 11. Its main competitors are macOS by Apple and Linux for personal computers and iPadOS and Android for tablets (cf. Usage share of operating systems § Market share by category).
  - Of note: "Windows" refers to both the overall product line and this sub-family of it.
- Windows Server: For a server computer. The latest version is Windows Server 2025. Unlike its client sibling, it has adopted a strong naming scheme. The main competitor of this family is Linux. (cf. Usage share of operating systems § Market share by category)
- Windows IoT (previously Windows Embedded): For IoT and embedded computers. The latest version is Windows 11 IoT Enterprise. Like Windows Server, the main competitor of this family is Linux. (cf. Usage share of operating systems § Market share by category)
- Windows PE: A lightweight version of Windows designed to operate as a live operating system, used for installing Windows on bare-metal computers (especially on many at once), recovery, or troubleshooting purposes. The latest version is Windows PE, version 10.0.

These top-level Windows families are no longer actively developed:

- MS-DOS-based versions of Windows, including Windows 1.0, Windows 2.0, Windows 3.x, and Windows 9x: The original top-level family of Windows prior to Windows NT, aimed at consumers. These versions used a monolithic kernel, with later versions in the family since Windows 3.0 having their own kernel. The last version was Windows Me; the family was discontinued after the release of Windows XP, with all consumer-oriented versions of Windows afterwards being based on the Windows NT kernel.
- Windows Mobile: Windows Mobile was a mobile phone and PDA operating system and the predecessor to Windows Phone. The first version was Pocket PC 2000; the third version, Windows Mobile 2003, was the first version to adopt the Windows Mobile trademark. The last published version was Windows Mobile 6.5.
- Windows Phone: Sold only to smartphone manufacturers. The first version was Windows Phone 7, followed by Windows Phone 8 and Windows Phone 8.1. It was succeeded by Windows 10 Mobile, which is also defunct.
- Windows Embedded Compact: Most commonly known by its former name, Windows CE, it is a hybrid kernel operating system optimized for low power and memory systems, with OEMs able to modify the UI to suit their needs. The final version was Windows Embedded Compact 2013, and it is succeeded by Windows IoT.

== History ==
The term Windows collectively describes any or all of several generations of Microsoft operating system products. These products are generally categorized as follows:

=== Early versions ===
The history of Windows dates back to 1981 when Microsoft started work on a program called "Interface Manager". The name "Windows" comes from the fact that the system was one of the first to use graphical boxes to represent programs; in the industry, at the time, these were called "windows" and the underlying software was called "windowing software". It was announced in November 1983 (after the Apple Lisa, but before the Macintosh) under the name "Windows", but Windows 1.0 was not released until November 1985. Windows 1.0 was to compete with Apple's operating system, but achieved little popularity. Windows 1.0 is not a complete operating system; rather, it extends MS-DOS. The shell of Windows 1.0 is a program known as the MS-DOS Executive. Components included Calculator, Calendar, Cardfile, Clipboard Viewer, Clock, Control Panel, Notepad, Paint, Reversi, Terminal and Write. Windows 1.0 does not allow overlapping windows. Instead, all windows are tiled. Only modal dialog boxes may appear over other windows. Microsoft sold as included Windows Development libraries with the C development environment, which included numerous windows samples.

Windows 2.0 was released in December 1987, and was more popular than its predecessor. It features several improvements to the user interface and memory management. Windows 2.03 changed the OS from tiled windows to overlapping windows. The result of this change led to Apple Computer filing a suit against Microsoft alleging infringement on Apple's copyrights (eventually settled in court in Microsoft's favor in 1993). Windows 2.0 also introduced more sophisticated keyboard shortcuts and could make use of expanded memory.

Windows 2.1 was released in two different versions: Windows/286 and Windows/386. Windows/386 uses the virtual 8086 mode of the Intel 80386 to multitask several DOS programs and the paged memory model to emulate expanded memory using available extended memory. Windows/286, in spite of its name, runs on both Intel 8086 and Intel 80286 processors. It runs in real mode but can make use of the high memory area.

In addition to full Windows packages, there were runtime-only versions that shipped with early Windows software from third parties and made it possible to run their Windows software on MS-DOS and without the full Windows feature set.

The early versions of Windows are often thought of as graphical shells, mostly because they ran on top of MS-DOS and used it for file system services. However, even the earliest Windows versions already assumed many typical operating system functions; notably, having their own executable file format and providing their own device drivers (timer, graphics, printer, mouse, keyboard and sound). Unlike MS-DOS, Windows allowed users to execute multiple graphical applications at the same time, through cooperative multitasking. Windows implemented an elaborate, segment-based, software virtual memory scheme, which allowed it to run applications larger than available memory: code segments and resources were swapped in and thrown away when memory became scarce; data segments moved in memory when a given application had relinquished processor control.

=== Windows 3.x ===
Windows 3.0, released in 1990

Windows 3.0, released in 1990, improved the design, mostly because of virtual memory and loadable virtual device drivers (VxDs) that allow Windows to share arbitrary devices between multi-tasked DOS applications. Windows 3.0 applications can run in protected mode, which gives them access to several megabytes of memory without the obligation to participate in the software virtual memory scheme. They run inside the same address space, where the segmented memory provides a degree of protection. Windows 3.0 also featured improvements to the user interface. Microsoft rewrote critical operations from C into assembly. Windows 3.0 was the first version of Windows to achieve broad commercial success, selling 2 million copies in the first six months.

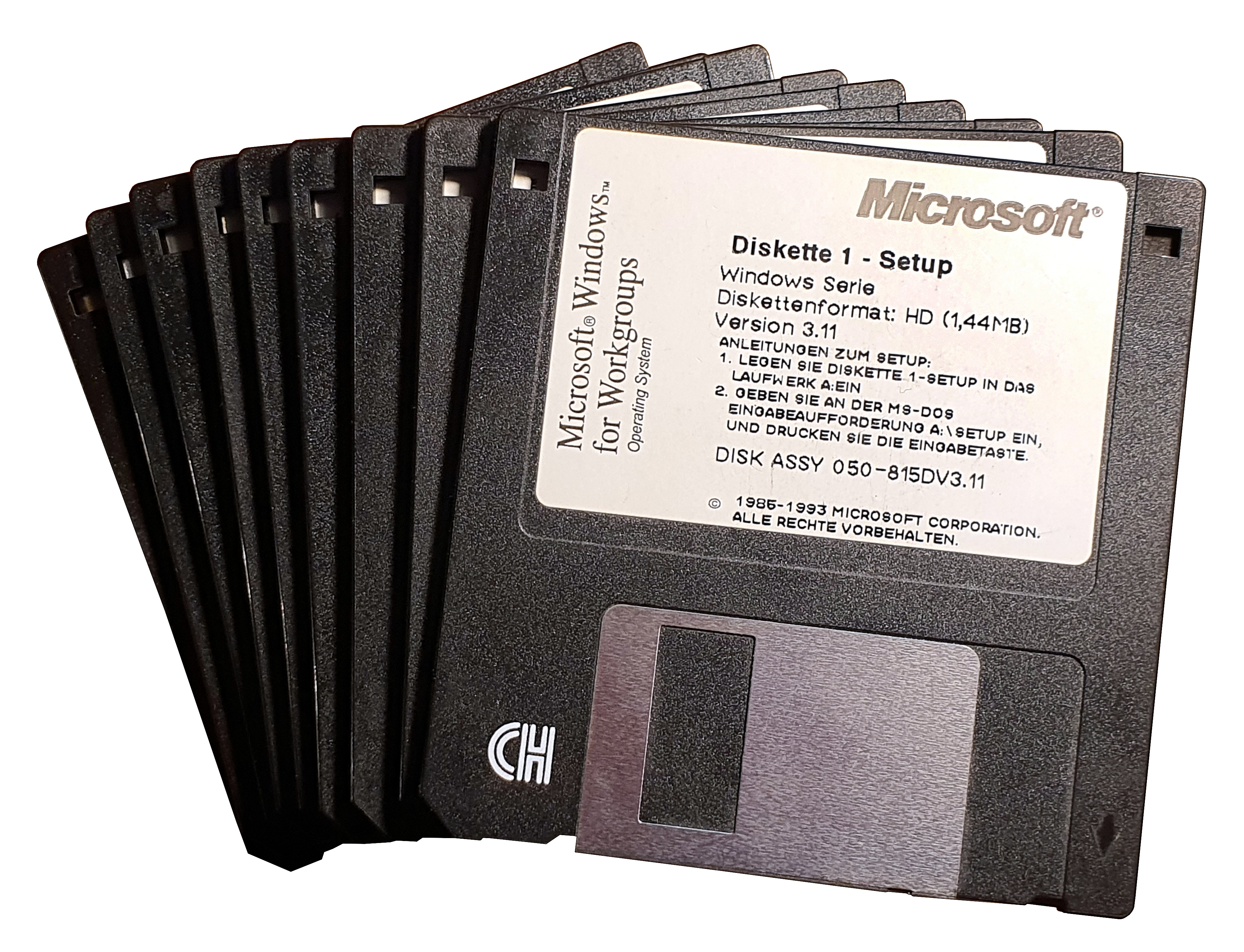
Versions before Windows 95 had to be installed from floppy disks by end users (or in professional environments with a network installation); here Windows for Workgroups with nine 3.5-inch-disks to be inserted sequentially.

Windows 3.1, made generally available on March 1, 1992, featured a facelift. In October 1992, Windows for Workgroups, a special version with integrated peer-to-peer networking features, was released. It was sold along with Windows 3.1. Support for Windows 3.1 ended on December 31, 2001.

Windows 3.2, released in 1994, is an updated version of the Chinese version of Windows 3.1. The update was limited to this language version, as it fixed only issues related to the complex writing system of the Chinese language. Windows 3.2 was generally sold by computer manufacturers with a ten-disk version of MS-DOS that also had Simplified Chinese characters in basic output and some translated utilities.

=== Windows 9x ===
The next major consumer-oriented release of Windows, Windows 95, was released on August 24, 1995. While still remaining MS-DOS-based, Windows 95 introduced support for native 32-bit applications, plug and play hardware, preemptive multitasking, long file names of up to 255 characters, and provided increased stability over its predecessors. Windows 95 also introduced a redesigned, object oriented user interface, replacing the previous Program Manager with the Start menu, taskbar, and Windows Explorer shell. Windows 95 was a major commercial success for Microsoft; Ina Fried of CNET remarked that "by the time Windows 95 was finally ushered off the market in 2001, it had become a fixture on computer desktops around the world." Microsoft published four OEM Service Releases (OSR) of Windows 95, each of which was roughly equivalent to a service pack. The first OSR of Windows 95 was also the first version of Windows to be bundled with Microsoft's web browser, Internet Explorer. Mainstream support for Windows 95 ended on December 31, 2000, and extended support for Windows 95 ended on December 31, 2001.

Windows 95 was followed up with the release of Windows 98 on June 25, 1998, which introduced the Windows Driver Model, support for USB composite devices, support for ACPI, hibernation, and support for multi-monitor configurations. Windows 98 also included integration with Internet Explorer 4 through Active Desktop and other aspects of the Windows Desktop Update (a series of enhancements to the Explorer shell which was also made available for Windows 95). In June 1999, Microsoft released Windows 98 Second Edition, an updated version of Windows 98. Windows 98 SE added Internet Explorer 5.0 and Windows Media Player 6.2 amongst other upgrades. Mainstream support for Windows 98 ended on June 30, 2002, and extended support for Windows 98 ended on July 11, 2006.

On September 14, 2000, Microsoft released Windows Me (Millennium Edition), the last DOS-based version of Windows. Windows Me incorporated visual interface enhancements from its Windows NT-based counterpart Windows 2000, had faster boot times than previous versions (which however, required the removal of the ability to access a real mode DOS environment, removing compatibility with some older programs), expanded multimedia functionality (including Windows Media Player 7, Windows Movie Maker, and the Windows Image Acquisition framework for retrieving images from scanners and digital cameras), additional system utilities such as System File Protection and System Restore, and updated home networking tools. However, Windows Me was faced with criticism for its speed and instability, along with hardware compatibility issues and its removal of real mode DOS support. PC World considered Windows Me to be one of the worst operating systems Microsoft had ever released, and the fourth worst tech product of all time.

=== Windows NT ===
==== Version history ====
===== Early versions (Windows NT 3.1/3.5/3.51/4.0/2000) =====
Windows logo (1995–2001)

In November 1988, a new development team within Microsoft (which included former Digital Equipment Corporation developers Dave Cutler and Mark Lucovsky) began work on a revamped version of IBM and Microsoft's OS/2 operating system known as "NT OS/2". NT OS/2 was intended to be a secure, multi-user operating system with POSIX compatibility and a modular, portable kernel with preemptive multitasking and support for multiple processor architectures. However, following the successful release of Windows 3.0, the NT development team decided to rework the project to use an extended 32-bit port of the Windows API known as Win32 instead of those of OS/2. Win32 maintained a similar structure to the Windows APIs (allowing existing Windows applications to easily be ported to the platform), but also supported the capabilities of the existing NT kernel. Following its approval by Microsoft's staff, development continued on what was now Windows NT, the first 32-bit version of Windows. However, IBM objected to the changes, and ultimately continued OS/2 development on its own.

Windows NT was the first Windows operating system based on a hybrid kernel. The hybrid kernel was designed as a modified microkernel, influenced by the Mach microkernel developed by Richard Rashid at Carnegie Mellon University, but without meeting all of the criteria of a pure microkernel.

The first release of the resulting operating system, Windows NT 3.1 (named to associate it with Windows 3.1) was released in July 1993, with versions for desktop workstations and servers. Windows NT 3.5 was released in September 1994, focusing on performance improvements and support for Novell's NetWare, and was followed up by Windows NT 3.51 in May 1995, which included additional improvements and support for the PowerPC architecture. Windows NT 4.0 was released in June 1996, introducing the redesigned interface of Windows 95 to the NT series. On February 17, 2000, Microsoft released Windows 2000, a successor to NT 4.0. The Windows NT name was dropped at this point in order to put a greater focus on the Windows brand.

===== Windows XP =====
A variation of the 2001–06 Windows logo from 2003 using the Segoe typeface instead of the Franklin Gothic typeface. This variation was mainly used for branding purposes.

The next major version of Windows NT, Windows XP, was released to manufacturing (RTM) on August 24, 2001, and to the general public on October 25, 2001. The introduction of Windows XP aimed to unify the consumer-oriented Windows 9x series with the architecture introduced by Windows NT, a change which Microsoft promised would provide better performance over its DOS-based predecessors. Windows XP would also introduce a redesigned user interface (including an updated Start menu and a "task-oriented" Windows Explorer), streamlined multimedia and networking features, Internet Explorer 6, integration with Microsoft's .NET Passport services, a "compatibility mode" to help provide backwards compatibility with software designed for previous versions of Windows, and Remote Assistance functionality.

At retail, Windows XP was marketed in two main editions: the "Home" edition was targeted towards consumers, while the "Professional" edition was targeted towards business environments and power users, and included additional security and networking features. Home and Professional were later accompanied by the "Media Center" edition (designed for home theater PCs, with an emphasis on support for DVD playback, TV tuner cards, DVR functionality, and remote controls), and the "Tablet PC" edition (designed for mobile devices meeting its specifications for a tablet computer, with support for stylus pen input and additional pen-enabled applications). Mainstream support for Windows XP ended on April 14, 2009. Extended support ended on April 8, 2014.

After Windows 2000, Microsoft also changed its release schedules for server operating systems; the server counterpart of Windows XP, Windows Server 2003, was released in April 2003. It was followed in March 2006, by Windows Server 2003 R2.

===== Windows Vista =====
Windows logo (2006–12)

After a lengthy development process, Windows Vista was released only for volume licensing on November 30, 2006, and finally, on January 30, 2007, it was officially released to everyone, including consumers. It contained a number of new features, from a redesigned shell and user interface to significant technical changes, with a particular focus on security features. It was available in a number of different editions, and has been subject to some criticism, such as drop of performance, longer boot time, criticism of new UAC, and stricter license agreement. Vista's server counterpart, Windows Server 2008 was released in early 2008.

===== Windows 7 =====
Windows logo (2009–12)

On July 22, 2009, Windows 7 and Windows Server 2008 R2 were released to manufacturing (RTM) and were officially released, including for the public, months later on October 22, 2009. Unlike its predecessor, Windows Vista, which introduced a large number of new features, Windows 7 was intended to be a more focused, incremental upgrade to the Windows line, with the goal of being compatible with applications and hardware with which Windows Vista was already compatible. Windows 7 has multi-touch support, a redesigned Windows shell with an updated taskbar with revealable jump lists that contain shortcuts to files frequently used with specific applications and shortcuts to tasks within the application, a home networking system called HomeGroup, and performance improvements.

===== Windows 8 and 8.1 =====
Windows logo (2012–15)

Windows 8, the successor to Windows 7, was released generally on October 26, 2012. A number of significant changes were made on Windows 8, including the introduction of a user interface based around Microsoft's Metro design language with optimizations for touch-based devices such as tablets and all-in-one PCs. These changes include the Start screen, which uses large tiles that are more convenient for touch interactions and allow for the display of continually updated information, and a new class of apps which are designed primarily for use on touch-based devices. The new Windows version required a minimum resolution of 1024×768 pixels, effectively making it unfit for netbooks with 800×600-pixel screens.

Other changes include increased integration with cloud services and other online platforms (such as social networks and Microsoft's own OneDrive (formerly SkyDrive) and Xbox Live services), the Windows Store service for software distribution, and a new variant known as Windows RT for use on devices that utilize the ARM architecture, and a new keyboard shortcut for screenshots. An update to Windows 8, called Windows 8.1, was released on October 17, 2013, and includes features such as new live tile sizes, deeper OneDrive integration, and many other revisions. Windows 8 and Windows 8.1 have been subject to some criticism, such as the removal of the Start menu.

===== Windows 10 =====
Windows logo (2015–21)

On September 30, 2014, Microsoft announced Windows 10 as the successor to Windows 8.1. It was released on July 29, 2015, and addresses shortcomings in the user interface first introduced with Windows 8. Changes on PC include the return of the Start Menu, a virtual desktop system, and the ability to run Windows Store apps within windows on the desktop rather than in full-screen mode. Windows 10 is said to be available to update from qualified Windows 7 with SP1, Windows 8.1 and Windows Phone 8.1 devices from the Get Windows 10 Application (for Windows 7, Windows 8.1) or Windows Update (Windows 7).

In February 2017, Microsoft announced the migration of its Windows source code repository from Perforce to Git. This migration involved 3.5 million separate files in a 300-gigabyte repository. By May 2017, 90 percent of its engineering team was using Git, in about 8500 commits and 1760 Windows builds per day.

In June 2021, shortly before Microsoft's announcement of Windows 11, Microsoft updated their lifecycle policy pages for Windows 10, revealing that support for their last release of Windows 10 will end on October 14, 2025. On April 27, 2023, Microsoft announced that version 22H2 would be the last of Windows 10.

Windows logo (2021–present)

===== Windows 11 =====
On June 24, 2021, Windows 11 was announced as the successor to Windows 10 during a livestream. The new operating system was designed to be more user-friendly and understandable. It was released on October 5, 2021. As of May 2022, Windows 11 is a free upgrade to Windows 10 users who meet the system requirements.

==== Windows 365 ====
In July 2021, Microsoft announced it will start selling subscriptions to virtualized Windows desktops as part of a new Windows 365 service in the following month. The new service will allow for cross-platform usage, aiming to make the operating system available for both Apple and Android users. It is a separate service and offers several variations including Windows 365 Frontline, Windows 365 Boot, and the Windows 365 app. The subscription service will be accessible through any operating system with a web browser. The new service is an attempt at capitalizing on the growing trend, fostered during the COVID-19 pandemic, for businesses to adopt a hybrid remote work environment, in which "employees split their time between the office and home". As the service will be accessible through web browsers, Microsoft will be able to bypass the need to publish the service through Google Play or the Apple App Store.

Microsoft announced Windows 365 availability to business and enterprise customers on August 2, 2021.

==== Multilingual support ====
Multilingual support has been built into Windows since Windows 3.0. The language for both the keyboard and the interface can be changed through the Region and Language Control Panel. Components for all supported input languages, such as Input Method Editors, are automatically installed during Windows installation (in Windows XP and earlier, files for East Asian languages, such as Chinese, and files for right-to-left scripts, such as Arabic, may need to be installed separately, also from the said Control Panel). Third-party IMEs may also be installed if a user feels that the provided one is insufficient for their needs. Since Windows 2000, English editions of Windows NT have East Asian IMEs (such as Microsoft Pinyin IME and Microsoft Japanese IME) bundled, but files for East Asian languages may be manually installed on Control Panel.

Interface languages for the operating system are free for download, but some languages are limited to certain editions of Windows. Language Interface Packs (LIPs) are redistributable and may be downloaded from Microsoft's Download Center and installed for any edition of Windows (XP or later) – they translate most, but not all, of the Windows interface, and require a certain base language (the language which Windows originally shipped with). This is used for most languages in emerging markets. Full Language Packs, which translate the complete operating system, are only available for specific editions of Windows (Ultimate and Enterprise editions of Windows Vista and 7, and all editions of Windows 8, 8.1 and RT except Single Language). They do not require a specific base language and are commonly used for more popular languages such as French or Chinese. These languages cannot be downloaded through the Download Center, but are available as optional updates through the Windows Update service (except Windows 8).

The interface language of installed applications is not affected by changes in the Windows interface language. The availability of languages depends on the application developers themselves.

Windows 8 and Windows Server 2012 introduce a new Language Control Panel where both the interface and input languages can be simultaneously changed, and language packs, regardless of type, can be downloaded from a central location. The PC Settings app in Windows 8.1 and Windows Server 2012 R2 also includes a counterpart settings page for this. Changing the interface language also changes the language of preinstalled Windows Store apps (such as Mail, Maps and News) and certain other Microsoft-developed apps (such as Remote Desktop). The above limitations for language packs are however still in effect, except that full language packs can be installed for any edition except Single Language, which caters to emerging markets.

==== Platform support ====
Windows NT included support for several platforms before the x86-based personal computer became dominant in the professional world. Windows NT 4.0 and its predecessors supported PowerPC, DEC Alpha and MIPS R4000 (although some of the platforms implement 64-bit computing, the OS treated them as 32-bit). Windows 2000 dropped support for all platforms, except the third generation x86 (known as IA-32) or newer in 32-bit mode. The client line of the Windows NT family still ran on IA-32 up to Windows 10 (the server line of the Windows NT family still ran on IA-32 up to Windows Server 2008).

With the introduction of the Intel Itanium architecture (IA-64), Microsoft released new versions of Windows to support it. Itanium versions of Windows XP and Windows Server 2003 were released at the same time as their mainstream x86 counterparts. Windows XP 64-Bit Edition (Version 2003), released in 2003, is the last Windows client operating system to support Itanium. Windows Server line continues to support this platform until Windows Server 2012; Windows Server 2008 R2 is the last Windows operating system to support Itanium architecture.

On April 25, 2005, Microsoft released Windows XP Professional x64 Edition and Windows Server 2003 x64 editions to support x86-64 (or simply x64), the 64-bit version of x86 architecture. Windows Vista was the first client version of Windows NT to be released simultaneously in IA-32 and x64 editions. As of 2024, x64 is still supported.

An edition of Windows 8 known as Windows RT was specifically created for computers with ARM architecture, and while ARM is still used for Windows smartphones with Windows 10, tablets with Windows RT will not be updated. Starting from Windows 10 Fall Creators Update (version 1709) and later includes support for ARM-based PCs.

=== Windows CE ===
Windows CE (officially known as Windows Embedded Compact), is an edition of Windows that runs on minimalistic computers, like satellite navigation systems and some mobile phones. Windows Embedded Compact is based on its own dedicated kernel, dubbed Windows CE kernel. Microsoft licenses Windows CE to OEMs and device makers. The OEMs and device makers can modify and create their own user interfaces and experiences, while Windows CE provides the technical foundation to do so.

Windows CE was used in the Dreamcast along with Sega's own proprietary OS for the console. Windows CE was the core from which Windows Mobile was derived. Its successor, Windows Phone 7, was based on components from both Windows CE 6.0 R3 and Windows CE 7.0. Windows Phone 8 however, is based on the same NT-kernel as Windows 8.

Windows Embedded Compact is not to be confused with Windows XP Embedded or Windows NT 4.0 Embedded, modular editions of Windows based on Windows NT kernel.

=== Xbox OS ===
Xbox OS is an unofficial name given to the version of Windows that runs on Xbox consoles. From Xbox One onwards it is an implementation with an emphasis on virtualization (using Hyper-V) as it is three operating systems running at once, consisting of the core operating system, a second implemented for games and a more Windows-like environment for applications. Microsoft updates Xbox One's OS every month, and these updates can be downloaded from the Xbox Live service to the Xbox and subsequently installed, or by using offline recovery images downloaded via a PC. It was originally based on NT 6.2 (Windows 8) kernel, and the latest version runs on an NT 10.0 base. This system is sometimes referred to as "Windows 10 on Xbox One". Xbox One and Xbox Series operating systems also allow limited (due to licensing restrictions and testing resources) backward compatibility with previous generation hardware, and the Xbox 360's system is backwards compatible with the original Xbox.

== Version control system ==
Up to and including every version before Windows 2000, Microsoft used an in-house version control system named Source Library Manager (SLM). Shortly after Windows 2000 was released, Microsoft switched to a fork of Perforce named Source Depot. This system was used up until 2017 when the system could not keep up with the size of Windows. Microsoft had begun to integrate Git into Team Foundation Server in 2013, but Windows (and Office) continued to rely on Source Depot. The Windows code in Source Depot was divided among 65 different repositories.

In 2017 Microsoft announced that it would start using Git, an open source version control system created by Linus Torvalds, and in May 2017 they reported that the migration into a new Git repository was complete.

=== VFSForGit ===
Each Git repository contains a complete history of all the files, which tends to be very large for Windows. Microsoft has been working on a new project called the Virtual File System for Git (VFSForGit) to address these challenges.

In 2021 the VFS for Git was superseded by Scalar.

== Timeline of releases ==
Table of Windows versions
Product name	Latest version	Release date	Codename	Windows support end date	Latest version of		
Product name	Latest version	Release date	Codename	Windows support end date	IE	DirectX	Edge
Windows 1.0	1.04	November 20, 1985	Interface Manager	December 31, 2001	—N/a	—N/a	—N/a
Windows 2.0	2.03	December 9, 1987	—N/a	December 31, 2001	—N/a	—N/a	—N/a
Windows 2.1	2.11	May 27, 1988	—N/a	December 31, 2001	—N/a	—N/a	—N/a
Windows 3.0	3.0	May 22, 1990	—N/a	December 31, 2001	—N/a	—N/a	—N/a
Windows 3.1	3.1	April 6, 1992	—N/a	December 31, 2001	5	—N/a	—N/a
Windows For Workgroups 3.1	3.1	October 27, 1992	Sparta, Winball	December 31, 2001	5	—N/a	—N/a
Windows NT 3.1	NT 3.1.528	July 27, 1993	Razzle	December 31, 2000	2	—N/a	—N/a
Windows For Workgroups 3.11	3.11	August 11, 1993	Snowball	December 31, 2001	5	—N/a	—N/a
Windows 3.2	3.2	November 22, 1993	—N/a	December 31, 2001	5	—N/a	—N/a
Windows NT 3.5	NT 3.5.807	September 21, 1994	Daytona	December 31, 2001	3	—N/a	—N/a
Windows NT 3.51	NT 3.51.1057	May 30, 1995	—N/a	December 31, 2001	5	—N/a	—N/a
Windows 95	4.0.950	August 24, 1995	Chicago, 4.0	December 31, 2001	5.5	8.0a	—N/a
Windows NT 4.0	NT 4.0.1381	July 31, 1996	Shell Update Release	June 30, 2004	6	3.0a	—N/a
Windows 98	4.10.1998	June 25, 1998	Memphis, 97, 4.1	July 11, 2006	6	9.0c	—N/a
Windows 98 SE	4.10.2222	June 10, 1999	—N/a	July 11, 2006	6	9.0c	—N/a
Windows 2000	NT 5.0.2195	February 17, 2000	—N/a	July 13, 2010	6	9.0c	—N/a
Windows Me	4.90.3000	September 14, 2000	Millennium, 4.9	July 11, 2006	6	9.0c	—N/a
Windows XP	NT 5.1.2600	October 25, 2001	Whistler	April 8, 2014	8	9.0c	—N/a
Windows XP 64-bit Edition	NT 5.2.3790	March 28, 2003	—N/a	April 8, 2014	8	9.0c	—N/a
Windows Server 2003	NT 5.2.3790	April 24, 2003	Whistler Server	July 14, 2015	8	9.0c	—N/a
Windows XP Professional x64 Edition	NT 5.2.3790	April 25, 2005	—N/a	April 8, 2014	8	9.0c	—N/a
Windows Fundamentals for Legacy PCs	NT 5.1.2600	July 8, 2006	Eiger, Mönch	April 8, 2014	8	9.0c	—N/a
Windows Vista	NT 6.0.6003	January 30, 2007	Longhorn	April 11, 2017	9	11	—N/a
Windows Home Server	NT 5.2.4500	November 4, 2007	Quattro	January 8, 2013	8	9.0c	—N/a
Windows Server 2008	NT 6.0.6003	February 27, 2008	Longhorn Server	January 14, 2020	9	11	—N/a
Windows 7	NT 6.1.7601	October 22, 2009	Windows 7	January 14, 2020	11	11	109
Windows Server 2008 R2	NT 6.1.7601	October 22, 2009	Windows Server 7	January 14, 2020	11	11	109
Windows Home Server 2011	NT 6.1.8800	April 6, 2011	Vail	April 12, 2016	11	11	109
Windows Server 2012	NT 6.2.9200	September 4, 2012	Server 8	October 10, 2023	11	11.1	109
Windows 8	NT 6.2.9200	October 26, 2012	—N/a	January 12, 2016	10	11.1	109
Windows 8.1	NT 6.3.9600	October 17, 2013	Blue	January 10, 2023	11	11.2	109
Windows Server 2012 R2	NT 6.3.9600	October 17, 2013	Server Blue	October 10, 2023	11	11.2	109
Windows 10	NT 10.0.19045	July 29, 2015	Various	October 14, 2025	11	12	158
Windows Server 2016	NT 10.0.14393	October 12, 2016	—N/a	January 12, 2027	11	12	158
Windows Server 2019	NT 10.0.17763	October 2, 2018	—N/a	January 9, 2029	11	12	158
Windows Server 2022	NT 10.0.20348	August 18, 2021	—N/a	October 14, 2031	11	12	158
Windows 11	NT 10.0.28000	October 5, 2021	Various	October 9, 2029	—N/a	12	158
Windows Server 2025	NT 10.0.26100	November 1, 2024	—N/a	November 14, 2034	—N/a	12	158
Legend: Unsupported Supported Latest version Preview version

Timeline of Windows versions

The Windows family tree

== Usage share and device sales ==

Version market share
As a percentage of desktop and laptop systems using Microsoft Windows, according to StatCounter data as of November 2026:

Desktop OS	StatCounter
Other versions	0.02%
Windows XP	0.05%
Windows 7	0.44%
Windows 8	0.02%
Windows 8.1	0.08%
Windows 10	25.09%
Windows 11	74.3%

Use of Windows 11 has exceeded Windows 10 globally since mid 2025, which in turn succeeded Windows 7 in early 2018.

For desktop and laptop computers, according to Net Applications and StatCounter (which track the use of operating systems in devices that are active on the Web), Windows was the most used operating-system family in August 2021, with around 91% usage share according to Net Applications and around 76% usage share according to StatCounter.

Including personal computers of all kinds (e.g., desktops, laptops, mobile devices, and game consoles), Windows OSes accounted for 32.67% of usage share in August 2021, compared to Android (highest, at 46.03%), iOS's 13.76%, iPadOS's 2.81%, and macOS's 2.51%, according to Net Applications and 30.73% of usage share in August 2021, compared to Android (highest, at 42.56%), iOS/iPadOS's 16.53%, and macOS's 6.51%, according to StatCounter.

Those statistics do not include servers (including cloud computing, where Linux has significantly more market share than Windows) as Net Applications and StatCounter use web browsing as a proxy for all use.

== Security ==
Early versions of Windows were designed at a time when malware and networking were less common, and had few built-in security features; they did not provide access privileges to allow a user to prevent other users from accessing their files, and they did not provide memory protection to prevent one process from reading or writing another process's address space or to prevent a process from code or data used by privileged-mode code.

While the Windows 9x series offered the option of having profiles for multiple users with separate profiles and home folders, it had no concept of access privileges, allowing any user to edit others' files. In addition, while it ran separate 32-bit applications in separate address spaces, protecting an application's code and data from being read or written by another application, it did not protect the first megabyte of memory from userland applications for compatibility reasons. This area of memory contains code critical to the functioning of the operating system, and by writing into this area of memory an application can crash or freeze the operating system. This was a source of instability as faulty applications could accidentally write into this region, potentially corrupting important operating system memory, which usually resulted in some form of system error and halt.

Windows NT was far more secure, implementing access privileges and full memory protection, and, while 32-bit programs meeting the DoD's C2 security rating. Prior to Windows Vista, the default user account created during the setup process was an administrator account; the user, and any program the user launched, had full access to the machine. Though Windows XP did offer an option of turning administrator accounts into limited accounts, the majority of home users did not do so, partially due to the number of programs which required administrator rights to function properly. As a result, most home users still ran as administrator all the time. These architectural flaws, combined with Windows's very high popularity, made Windows a frequent target of computer worm and virus writers.

Furthermore, although Windows NT and its successors are designed for security (including on a network) and multi-user PCs, they were not initially designed with Internet security in mind as much, since, when it was first developed in the early 1990s, Internet use was less prevalent.

In a 2002 strategy memo entitled "Trustworthy computing" sent to every Microsoft employee, Bill Gates declared that security should become Microsoft's highest priority.

Windows Vista introduced a privilege elevation system called User Account Control. When logging in as a standard user, a logon session is created and a token containing only the most basic privileges is assigned. In this way, the new logon session is incapable of making changes that would affect the entire system. When logging in as a user in the Administrators group, two separate tokens are assigned. The first token contains all privileges typically awarded to an administrator, and the second is a restricted token similar to what a standard user would receive. User applications, including the Windows shell, are then started with the restricted token, resulting in a reduced privilege environment even under an Administrator account. When an application requests higher privileges or "Run as administrator" is clicked, UAC will prompt for confirmation and, if consent is given (including administrator credentials if the account requesting the elevation is not a member of the administrators group), start the process using the unrestricted token.

Leaked documents from 2013 to 2016 codenamed Vault 7 detail the capabilities of the CIA to perform electronic surveillance and cyber warfare, such as the ability to compromise operating systems such as Windows.

In August 2019, computer experts reported that the BlueKeep security vulnerability, CVE-2019-0708, that potentially affects older unpatched Windows versions via the program's Remote Desktop Protocol, allowing for the possibility of remote code execution, may include related flaws, collectively named DejaBlue, affecting newer Windows versions (i.e., Windows 7 and all recent versions) as well. In addition, experts reported a Microsoft security vulnerability, CVE-2019-1162, based on legacy code involving Microsoft CTF and ctfmon (ctfmon.exe), that affects all Windows versions from Windows XP to the then most recent Windows 10 versions; a patch to correct the flaw is available.

Microsoft releases security patches through its Windows Update service approximately once a month (usually the second Tuesday of the month), although critical updates are made available at shorter intervals when necessary. Versions subsequent to Windows 2000 SP3 and Windows XP implemented automatic download and installation of updates, substantially increasing the number of users installing security updates.

Windows integrates the Windows Defender antivirus, which is seen as one of the best available. Windows also implements Secure Boot, Control Flow Guard, ransomware protection, BitLocker disk encryption, a firewall, and Windows SmartScreen.

In July 2024, Microsoft signalled an intention to limit kernel access and improve overall security, following a highly publicised CrowdStrike update that caused 8.5 million Windows PCs to crash. Part of that initiative is to rewrite parts of Windows in Rust, a memory-safe language. In 2025 Microsoft stopped offering support to Window 10 users, including providing security updates. Microsoft encouraged people to upgrade to Windows 11 or if this wasn't possible, to sign-up for extended security updates.

Due to national security problems and reliance on foreign technology (digital sovereignty), some countries (like France, Denmark and Netherlands) are moving away from Microsoft Windows to prevent foreign espionage.

=== File permissions ===
All Windows versions from Windows NT 3 have been based on a file system permission system referred to as AGDLP (Accounts, Global, Domain Local, Permissions) in which file permissions are applied to the file/folder in the form of a 'local group' which then has other 'global groups' as members. These global groups then hold other groups or users depending on different Windows versions used. This system varies from other vendor products such as Linux and NetWare due to the 'static' allocation of permission being applied directly to the file or folder. However using this process of AGLP/AGDLP/AGUDLP allows a small number of static permissions to be applied and allows for easy changes to the account groups without reapplying the file permissions on the files and folders.

== Alternative implementations ==
Owing to the operating system's popularity, a number of applications have been released that aim to provide compatibility with Windows applications, either as a compatibility layer for another operating system, or as a standalone system that can run software written for Windows out of the box. These include:

- Wine – a free and open-source implementation of the Windows API, allowing one to run many Windows applications on x86-based platforms, including UNIX, Linux and macOS. Wine developers refer to it as a "compatibility layer" and use Windows-style APIs to emulate a Windows environment.
  - CrossOver – a Wine package with licensed fonts. Its developers are regular contributors to Wine.
  - Proton – A fork of Wine by Valve to run Windows games on Linux and other Unix-based operating systems.
- ReactOS – an open-source OS intended to run the same software as Windows, originally designed to simulate Windows NT 4.0, later aiming at Windows 7 compatibility. It has been in the development stage since 1996.
- Freedows OS – an open-source attempt at creating a Windows clone for x86 platforms, intended to be released under the GNU General Public License. Started in 1996 by Reece K. Sellin, the project was never completed, getting only to the stage of design discussions which featured a number of novel concepts until it was suspended in 2002.

== See also ==
- Wintel
