= Version history for TLS/SSL support in web browsers =

History of web browser protocol support

Version history for TLS/SSL support in web browsers tracks the implementation of Transport Layer Security protocol versions in major web browsers.

TLS/SSL support history of web browsers
Browser or OS API	Version		Platforms	SSL protocols		TLS protocols				Certificate support			Vulnerability (Note: Note actual security depends on other factors such as negotiated cipher, encryption strength, etc. (see § Cipher table).)						Protocol selection by user (Note: Whether a user or administrator can choose the protocols to be used or not. If yes, several attacks such as BEAST (vulnerable in SSL 3.0 and TLS 1.0) or POODLE (vulnerable in SSL 3.0) can be avoided.)
Browser or OS API	Version		Platforms	SSL 2.0 (insecure)	SSL 3.0 (insecure)	TLS 1.0 (deprecated)	TLS 1.1 (deprecated)	TLS 1.2	TLS 1.3	EV (Note: Whether EV SSL and DV SSL (normal SSL) can be distinguished by indicators (green lock icon, green address bar, etc.) or not.)	SHA-2	ECDSA	BEAST (Note: e.g. 1/n-1 record splitting.)	CRIME (Note: e.g. Disabling header compression in HTTPS/SPDY.)	POODLE (SSLv3) (Note: Complete mitigations; disabling SSL 3.0 itself, "anti-POODLE record splitting". "Anti-POODLE record splitting" is effective only with client-side implementation and valid according to the SSL 3.0 specification, however, it may also cause compatibility issues due to problems in server-side implementations.; Partial mitigations; disabling fallback to SSL 3.0, TLS_FALLBACK_SCSV, disabling cipher suites with CBC mode of operation. If the server also supports TLS_FALLBACK_SCSV, the POODLE attack will fail against this combination of server and browser, but connections where the server does not support TLS_FALLBACK_SCSV and does support SSL 3.0 will still be vulnerable. If disabling cipher suites with CBC mode of operation in SSL 3.0, only cipher suites with RC4 are available, RC4 attacks become easier.; When disabling SSL 3.0 manually, POODLE attack will fail.)	RC4 (Note: Complete mitigation; disabling cipher suites with RC4.; Partial mitigations to keeping compatibility with old systems; setting the priority of RC4 to lower.)	FREAK	Logjam	Protocol selection by user
Google Chrome (Chrome for Android) (Note: Google Chrome (and Chromium) supports TLS 1.0, and TLS 1.1 from version 22 (it was added, then dropped from version 21). TLS 1.2 support had been added, then dropped from Chrome 29.) (Note: Uses the TLS implementation provided by BoringSSL for Android, OS X, and Windows or by NSS for Linux. Google is switching the TLS library used in Chrome to BoringSSL from NSS completely.)	1–9		Windows (10+) macOS (13+); Linux; Android (10+) iOS (18+); ChromeOS	Disabled by default	Yes	Yes	No	No	No	Yes (only desktop)	Requires SHA-2 compatible OS	Needs ECC compatible OS	Not affected	Vulnerable (HTTPS)	Vulnerable	Vulnerable	Vulnerable (except Windows)	Vulnerable	Yes (Note: Configure enabling/disabling of each protocols via setting/option (menu name is dependent on browsers).)
Google Chrome (Chrome for Android)	10–20		Windows (10+) macOS (13+); Linux; Android (10+) iOS (18+); ChromeOS	No	Yes	Yes	No	No	No	Yes (only desktop)	Requires SHA-2 compatible OS	Needs ECC compatible OS	Not affected	Vulnerable (HTTPS/SPDY)	Vulnerable	Vulnerable	Vulnerable (except Windows)	Vulnerable	Yes
Google Chrome (Chrome for Android)	21		Windows (10+) macOS (13+); Linux; Android (10+) iOS (18+); ChromeOS	No	Yes	Yes	No	No	No	Yes (only desktop)	Requires SHA-2 compatible OS	Needs ECC compatible OS	Not affected	Mitigated	Vulnerable	Vulnerable	Vulnerable (except Windows)	Vulnerable	Yes
Google Chrome (Chrome for Android)	22–29		Windows (10+) macOS (13+); Linux; Android (10+) iOS (18+); ChromeOS	No	Yes	Yes	Yes	No	No	Yes (only desktop)	Requires SHA-2 compatible OS	Needs ECC compatible OS	Not affected	Mitigated	Vulnerable	Vulnerable	Vulnerable (except Windows)	Vulnerable	Temporary (Note: configure the maximum and the minimum version of enabling protocols with command-line option.)
Google Chrome (Chrome for Android)	30–32		Windows (10+) macOS (13+); Linux; Android (10+) iOS (18+); ChromeOS	No	Yes	Yes	Yes	Yes	No	Yes (only desktop)	Requires SHA-2 compatible OS	Needs ECC compatible OS	Not affected	Mitigated	Vulnerable	Vulnerable	Vulnerable (except Windows)	Vulnerable	Temporary
Google Chrome (Chrome for Android)	33–37		Windows (10+) macOS (13+); Linux; Android (10+) iOS (18+); ChromeOS	No	Yes	Yes	Yes	Yes	No	Yes (only desktop)	Requires SHA-2 compatible OS	Needs ECC compatible OS	Not affected	Mitigated	Partly mitigated (Note: TLS_FALLBACK_SCSV is implemented. Fallback to SSL 3.0 is disabled since version 39.)	Lowest priority	Vulnerable (except Windows)	Vulnerable	Temporary
Google Chrome (Chrome for Android)	38, 39		Windows (10+) macOS (13+); Linux; Android (10+) iOS (18+); ChromeOS	No	Yes	Yes	Yes	Yes	No	Yes (only desktop)	Yes	Needs ECC compatible OS	Not affected	Mitigated	Partly mitigated	Lowest priority	Vulnerable (except Windows)	Vulnerable	Temporary
Google Chrome (Chrome for Android)	40		Windows (10+) macOS (13+); Linux; Android (10+) iOS (18+); ChromeOS	No	Disabled by default	Yes	Yes	Yes	No	Yes (only desktop)	Yes	Needs ECC compatible OS	Not affected	Mitigated	Mitigated (Note: In addition to TLS_FALLBACK_SCSV and disabling a fallback to SSL 3.0, SSL 3.0 itself is disabled by default.)	Lowest priority	Vulnerable (except Windows)	Vulnerable	Yes (Note: Configure the minimum version of enabling protocols via chrome://flags (the maximum version can be configured with command-line option).)
Google Chrome (Chrome for Android)	41, 42		Windows (10+) macOS (13+); Linux; Android (10+) iOS (18+); ChromeOS	No	Disabled by default	Yes	Yes	Yes	No	Yes (only desktop)	Yes	Needs ECC compatible OS	Not affected	Mitigated	Mitigated	Lowest priority	Mitigated	Vulnerable	Yes
Google Chrome (Chrome for Android)	43		Windows (10+) macOS (13+); Linux; Android (10+) iOS (18+); ChromeOS	No	Disabled by default	Yes	Yes	Yes	No	Yes (only desktop)	Yes	Needs ECC compatible OS	Not affected	Mitigated	Mitigated	Only as fallback (Note: Only when no cipher suites with other than RC4 is available, cipher suites with RC4 will be used as a fallback.)	Mitigated	Vulnerable	Yes
Google Chrome (Chrome for Android)	44–47		Windows (10+) macOS (13+); Linux; Android (10+) iOS (18+); ChromeOS	No	No	Yes	Yes	Yes	No	Yes (only desktop)	Yes	Needs ECC compatible OS	Not affected	Mitigated	Not affected	Only as fallback	Mitigated	Mitigated	Temporary
Google Chrome (Chrome for Android)	48, 49		Windows (10+) macOS (13+); Linux; Android (10+) iOS (18+); ChromeOS	No	No	Yes	Yes	Yes	No	Yes (only desktop)	Yes	Needs ECC compatible OS	Not affected	Mitigated	Not affected	Disabled by default (Note: All RC4 cipher suites are disabled by default.)	Mitigated	Mitigated	Temporary
Google Chrome (Chrome for Android)	50–53		Windows (10+) macOS (13+); Linux; Android (10+) iOS (18+); ChromeOS	No	No	Yes	Yes	Yes	No	Yes (only desktop)	Yes	Yes	Not affected	Mitigated	Not affected	Disabled by default	Mitigated	Mitigated	Temporary
Google Chrome (Chrome for Android)	54–66		Windows (10+) macOS (13+); Linux; Android (10+) iOS (18+); ChromeOS	No	No	Yes	Yes	Yes	Disabled by default (draft version)	Yes (only desktop)	Yes	Yes	Not affected	Mitigated	Not affected	Disabled by default	Mitigated	Mitigated	Temporary
Google Chrome (Chrome for Android)	67–69		Windows (10+) macOS (13+); Linux; Android (10+) iOS (18+); ChromeOS	No	No	Yes	Yes	Yes	Yes (draft version)	Yes (only desktop)	Yes	Yes	Not affected	Mitigated	Not affected	Disabled by default	Mitigated	Mitigated	Temporary
Google Chrome (Chrome for Android)	70–83		Windows (10+) macOS (13+); Linux; Android (10+) iOS (18+); ChromeOS	No	No	Yes	Yes	Yes	Yes	Yes (only desktop)	Yes	Yes	Not affected	Mitigated	Not affected	Disabled by default	Mitigated	Mitigated	Temporary
Google Chrome (Chrome for Android)	84–90		Windows (10+) macOS (13+); Linux; Android (10+) iOS (18+); ChromeOS	No	No	Warn by default	Warn by default	Yes	Yes	Yes (only desktop)	Yes	Yes	Not affected	Mitigated	Not affected	Disabled by default	Mitigated	Mitigated	Temporary
Google Chrome (Chrome for Android)	91–155 / 157		Windows (10+) macOS (13+); Linux; Android (10+) iOS (18+); ChromeOS	No	No	No	No	Yes	Yes	Yes (only desktop)	Yes	Yes	Not affected	Mitigated	Not affected	Disabled by default	Mitigated	Mitigated	Temporary
Google Chrome (Chrome for Android)	ESC 156	158	Windows (10+) macOS (13+); Linux; Android (10+) iOS (18+); ChromeOS	No	No	No	No	Yes	Yes	Yes (only desktop)	Yes	Yes	Not affected	Mitigated	Not affected	Disabled by default	Mitigated	Mitigated	Temporary
Browser or OS API	Version		Platforms	SSL 2.0 (insecure)	SSL 3.0 (insecure)	TLS 1.0 (deprecated)	TLS 1.1 (deprecated)	TLS 1.2	TLS 1.3	EV certificate	SHA-2 certificate	ECDSA certificate	BEAST	CRIME	POODLE (SSLv3)	RC4	FREAK	Logjam	Protocol selection by user
Microsoft Edge (Chromium-based) OS-independent	79–83		Windows (10+) macOS (13+); Linux; Android (10+) iOS (18+)	No	No	Yes	Yes	Yes	Yes	Yes	Yes	Yes	Mitigated	Not affected	Not affected	Disabled by default	Mitigated	Mitigated	Yes
Microsoft Edge (Chromium-based) OS-independent	84–90		Windows (10+) macOS (13+); Linux; Android (10+) iOS (18+)	No	No	Warn by default	Warn by default	Yes	Yes	Yes	Yes	Yes	Mitigated	Not affected	Not affected	Disabled by default	Mitigated	Mitigated	Yes
Microsoft Edge (Chromium-based) OS-independent	91–155 / 157		Windows (10+) macOS (13+); Linux; Android (10+) iOS (18+)	No	No	No	No	Yes	Yes	Yes	Yes	Yes	Mitigated	Not affected	Not affected	Disabled by default	Mitigated	Mitigated	Yes
Microsoft Edge (Chromium-based) OS-independent	ESC 156	158	Windows (10+) macOS (13+); Linux; Android (10+) iOS (18+)	No	No	No	No	Yes	Yes	Yes	Yes	Yes	Mitigated	Not affected	Not affected	Disabled by default	Mitigated	Mitigated	Yes
Browser or OS API	Version		Platforms	SSL 2.0 (insecure)	SSL 3.0 (insecure)	TLS 1.0 (deprecated)	TLS 1.1 (deprecated)	TLS 1.2	TLS 1.3	EV certificate	SHA-2 certificate	ECDSA certificate	BEAST	CRIME	POODLE (SSLv3)	RC4	FREAK	Logjam	Protocol selection by user
Mozilla Firefox (Firefox for mobile) (Note: Uses the TLS implementation provided by NSS. As of Firefox 22, Firefox supports only TLS 1.0 despite the bundled NSS supporting TLS 1.1. Since Firefox 23, TLS 1.1 can be enabled, but was not enabled by default due to issues. Firefox 24 has TLS 1.2 support disabled by default. TLS 1.1 and TLS 1.2 have been enabled by default in Firefox 27 release.)	1.0, 1.5		Windows (10+) macOS (10.15+); Linux; Android (8.0+) iOS (15+); ~~Firefox OS~~; ~~Maemo~~ ESR 153 only for: Windows (10+) macOS (10.15+); Linux ESR 115 only for: Windows 7–8.1 macOS 10.12–10.14	Yes	Yes	Yes	No	No	No	No	Yes	No	Not affected	Not affected	Vulnerable	Vulnerable	Not affected	Vulnerable	Yes
Mozilla Firefox (Firefox for mobile)	2		Windows (10+) macOS (10.15+); Linux; Android (8.0+) iOS (15+); ~~Firefox OS~~; ~~Maemo~~ ESR 153 only for: Windows (10+) macOS (10.15+); Linux ESR 115 only for: Windows 7–8.1 macOS 10.12–10.14	Disabled by default	Yes	Yes	No	No	No	No	Yes	Yes	Not affected	Not affected	Vulnerable	Vulnerable	Not affected	Vulnerable	Yes
Mozilla Firefox (Firefox for mobile)	3–7		Windows (10+) macOS (10.15+); Linux; Android (8.0+) iOS (15+); ~~Firefox OS~~; ~~Maemo~~ ESR 153 only for: Windows (10+) macOS (10.15+); Linux ESR 115 only for: Windows 7–8.1 macOS 10.12–10.14	Disabled by default	Yes	Yes	No	No	No	Yes	Yes	Yes	Not affected	Not affected	Vulnerable	Vulnerable	Not affected	Vulnerable	Yes
Mozilla Firefox (Firefox for mobile)	8–10; ESR 10		Windows (10+) macOS (10.15+); Linux; Android (8.0+) iOS (15+); ~~Firefox OS~~; ~~Maemo~~ ESR 153 only for: Windows (10+) macOS (10.15+); Linux ESR 115 only for: Windows 7–8.1 macOS 10.12–10.14	No	Yes	Yes	No	No	No	Yes	Yes	Yes	Not affected	Not affected	Vulnerable	Vulnerable	Not affected	Vulnerable	Yes
Mozilla Firefox (Firefox for mobile)	11–14		Windows (10+) macOS (10.15+); Linux; Android (8.0+) iOS (15+); ~~Firefox OS~~; ~~Maemo~~ ESR 153 only for: Windows (10+) macOS (10.15+); Linux ESR 115 only for: Windows 7–8.1 macOS 10.12–10.14	No	Yes	Yes	No	No	No	Yes	Yes	Yes	Not affected	Vulnerable (SPDY)	Vulnerable	Vulnerable	Not affected	Vulnerable	Yes
Mozilla Firefox (Firefox for mobile)	15–22; ESR 17.0–17.0.10		Windows (10+) macOS (10.15+); Linux; Android (8.0+) iOS (15+); ~~Firefox OS~~; ~~Maemo~~ ESR 153 only for: Windows (10+) macOS (10.15+); Linux ESR 115 only for: Windows 7–8.1 macOS 10.12–10.14	No	Yes	Yes	No	No	No	Yes	Yes	Yes	Not affected	Mitigated	Vulnerable	Vulnerable	Not affected	Vulnerable	Yes
Mozilla Firefox (Firefox for mobile)	ESR 17.0.11		Windows (10+) macOS (10.15+); Linux; Android (8.0+) iOS (15+); ~~Firefox OS~~; ~~Maemo~~ ESR 153 only for: Windows (10+) macOS (10.15+); Linux ESR 115 only for: Windows 7–8.1 macOS 10.12–10.14	No	Yes	Yes	No	No	No	Yes	Yes	Yes	Not affected	Mitigated	Vulnerable	Lowest priority	Not affected	Vulnerable	Yes
Mozilla Firefox (Firefox for mobile)	23		Windows (10+) macOS (10.15+); Linux; Android (8.0+) iOS (15+); ~~Firefox OS~~; ~~Maemo~~ ESR 153 only for: Windows (10+) macOS (10.15+); Linux ESR 115 only for: Windows 7–8.1 macOS 10.12–10.14	No	Yes	Yes	Disabled by default	No	No	Yes	Yes	Yes	Not affected	Mitigated	Vulnerable	Vulnerable	Not affected	Vulnerable	Yes (Note: Configure the maximum and the minimum version of enabling protocols via about:config.)
Mozilla Firefox (Firefox for mobile)	24, 25.0.0; ESR 24.0–24.1.0		Windows (10+) macOS (10.15+); Linux; Android (8.0+) iOS (15+); ~~Firefox OS~~; ~~Maemo~~ ESR 153 only for: Windows (10+) macOS (10.15+); Linux ESR 115 only for: Windows 7–8.1 macOS 10.12–10.14	No	Yes	Yes	Disabled by default	Disabled by default	No	Yes	Yes	Yes	Not affected	Mitigated	Vulnerable	Vulnerable	Not affected	Vulnerable	Yes
Mozilla Firefox (Firefox for mobile)	25.0.1, 26; ESR 24.1.1–24.8.1		Windows (10+) macOS (10.15+); Linux; Android (8.0+) iOS (15+); ~~Firefox OS~~; ~~Maemo~~ ESR 153 only for: Windows (10+) macOS (10.15+); Linux ESR 115 only for: Windows 7–8.1 macOS 10.12–10.14	No	Yes	Yes	Disabled by default	Disabled by default	No	Yes	Yes	Yes	Not affected	Mitigated	Vulnerable	Lowest priority	Not affected	Vulnerable	Yes
Mozilla Firefox (Firefox for mobile)	27–33; ESR 31.0–31.2.0		Windows (10+) macOS (10.15+); Linux; Android (8.0+) iOS (15+); ~~Firefox OS~~; ~~Maemo~~ ESR 153 only for: Windows (10+) macOS (10.15+); Linux ESR 115 only for: Windows 7–8.1 macOS 10.12–10.14	No	Yes	Yes	Yes	Yes	No	Yes	Yes	Yes	Not affected	Mitigated	Vulnerable	Lowest priority	Not affected	Vulnerable	Yes
Mozilla Firefox (Firefox for mobile)	34, 35; ESR 31.3.0–31.7.0		Windows (10+) macOS (10.15+); Linux; Android (8.0+) iOS (15+); ~~Firefox OS~~; ~~Maemo~~ ESR 153 only for: Windows (10+) macOS (10.15+); Linux ESR 115 only for: Windows 7–8.1 macOS 10.12–10.14	No	Disabled by default	Yes	Yes	Yes	No	Yes	Yes	Yes	Not affected	Mitigated	Mitigated (Note: SSL 3.0 itself is disabled by default. In addition, fallback to SSL 3.0 is disabled since version 34, and TLS_FALLBACK_SCSV is implemented since 35.0 and ESR 31.3.0.)	Lowest priority	Not affected	Vulnerable	Yes
Mozilla Firefox (Firefox for mobile)	ESR 31.8.0		Windows (10+) macOS (10.15+); Linux; Android (8.0+) iOS (15+); ~~Firefox OS~~; ~~Maemo~~ ESR 153 only for: Windows (10+) macOS (10.15+); Linux ESR 115 only for: Windows 7–8.1 macOS 10.12–10.14	No	Disabled by default	Yes	Yes	Yes	No	Yes	Yes	Yes	Not affected	Mitigated	Mitigated	Lowest priority	Not affected	Mitigated	Yes
Mozilla Firefox (Firefox for mobile)	36–38; ESR 38.0–38.0.1		Windows (10+) macOS (10.15+); Linux; Android (8.0+) iOS (15+); ~~Firefox OS~~; ~~Maemo~~ ESR 153 only for: Windows (10+) macOS (10.15+); Linux ESR 115 only for: Windows 7–8.1 macOS 10.12–10.14	No	Disabled by default	Yes	Yes	Yes	No	Yes	Yes	Yes	Not affected	Mitigated	Mitigated	Only as fallback	Not affected	Vulnerable	Yes
Mozilla Firefox (Firefox for mobile)	ESR 38.1.0–38.8.0		Windows (10+) macOS (10.15+); Linux; Android (8.0+) iOS (15+); ~~Firefox OS~~; ~~Maemo~~ ESR 153 only for: Windows (10+) macOS (10.15+); Linux ESR 115 only for: Windows 7–8.1 macOS 10.12–10.14	No	Disabled by default	Yes	Yes	Yes	No	Yes	Yes	Yes	Not affected	Mitigated	Mitigated	Only as fallback	Not affected	Mitigated	Yes
Mozilla Firefox (Firefox for mobile)	39–43		Windows (10+) macOS (10.15+); Linux; Android (8.0+) iOS (15+); ~~Firefox OS~~; ~~Maemo~~ ESR 153 only for: Windows (10+) macOS (10.15+); Linux ESR 115 only for: Windows 7–8.1 macOS 10.12–10.14	No	No	Yes	Yes	Yes	No	Yes	Yes	Yes	Not affected	Mitigated	Not affected	Only as fallback	Not affected	Mitigated	Yes
Mozilla Firefox (Firefox for mobile)	44–48; ESR 45		Windows (10+) macOS (10.15+); Linux; Android (8.0+) iOS (15+); ~~Firefox OS~~; ~~Maemo~~ ESR 153 only for: Windows (10+) macOS (10.15+); Linux ESR 115 only for: Windows 7–8.1 macOS 10.12–10.14	No	No	Yes	Yes	Yes	No	Yes	Yes	Yes	Not affected	Mitigated	Not affected	Disabled by default	Not affected	Mitigated	Yes
Mozilla Firefox (Firefox for mobile)	49–59; ESR 52		Windows (10+) macOS (10.15+); Linux; Android (8.0+) iOS (15+); ~~Firefox OS~~; ~~Maemo~~ ESR 153 only for: Windows (10+) macOS (10.15+); Linux ESR 115 only for: Windows 7–8.1 macOS 10.12–10.14	No	No	Yes	Yes	Yes	Disabled by default (draft version)	Yes	Yes	Yes	Not affected	Mitigated	Not affected	Disabled by default	Not affected	Mitigated	Yes
Mozilla Firefox (Firefox for mobile)	60–62; ESR 60		Windows (10+) macOS (10.15+); Linux; Android (8.0+) iOS (15+); ~~Firefox OS~~; ~~Maemo~~ ESR 153 only for: Windows (10+) macOS (10.15+); Linux ESR 115 only for: Windows 7–8.1 macOS 10.12–10.14	No	No	Yes	Yes	Yes	Yes (draft version)	Yes	Yes	Yes	Not affected	Mitigated	Not affected	Disabled by default	Not affected	Mitigated	Yes
Mozilla Firefox (Firefox for mobile)	63–77; ESR 68		Windows (10+) macOS (10.15+); Linux; Android (8.0+) iOS (15+); ~~Firefox OS~~; ~~Maemo~~ ESR 153 only for: Windows (10+) macOS (10.15+); Linux ESR 115 only for: Windows 7–8.1 macOS 10.12–10.14	No	No	Yes	Yes	Yes	Yes	Yes	Yes	Yes	Not affected	Mitigated	Not affected	Disabled by default	Not affected	Mitigated	Yes
Mozilla Firefox (Firefox for mobile)	78–159; ESR 78.0–115.44; ESR 140.0–153.6		Windows (10+) macOS (10.15+); Linux; Android (8.0+) iOS (15+); ~~Firefox OS~~; ~~Maemo~~ ESR 153 only for: Windows (10+) macOS (10.15+); Linux ESR 115 only for: Windows 7–8.1 macOS 10.12–10.14	No	No	Disabled by default	Disabled by default	Yes	Yes	Yes	Yes	Yes	Not affected	Mitigated	Not affected	Disabled by default	Not affected	Mitigated	Yes
Mozilla Firefox (Firefox for mobile)	ESR 115.45		Windows (10+) macOS (10.15+); Linux; Android (8.0+) iOS (15+); ~~Firefox OS~~; ~~Maemo~~ ESR 153 only for: Windows (10+) macOS (10.15+); Linux ESR 115 only for: Windows 7–8.1 macOS 10.12–10.14	No	No	Disabled by default	Disabled by default	Yes	Yes	Yes	Yes	Yes	Not affected	Mitigated	Not affected	Disabled by default	Not affected	Mitigated	Yes
Mozilla Firefox (Firefox for mobile)	ESR 153.7		Windows (10+) macOS (10.15+); Linux; Android (8.0+) iOS (15+); ~~Firefox OS~~; ~~Maemo~~ ESR 153 only for: Windows (10+) macOS (10.15+); Linux ESR 115 only for: Windows 7–8.1 macOS 10.12–10.14	No	No	Disabled by default	Disabled by default	Yes	Yes	Yes	Yes	Yes	Not affected	Mitigated	Not affected	Disabled by default	Not affected	Mitigated	Yes
Mozilla Firefox (Firefox for mobile)	160		Windows (10+) macOS (10.15+); Linux; Android (8.0+) iOS (15+); ~~Firefox OS~~; ~~Maemo~~ ESR 153 only for: Windows (10+) macOS (10.15+); Linux ESR 115 only for: Windows 7–8.1 macOS 10.12–10.14	No	No	Disabled by default	Disabled by default	Yes	Yes	Yes	Yes	Yes	Not affected	Mitigated	Not affected	Disabled by default	Not affected	Mitigated	Yes
Browser or OS API	Version		Platforms	SSL 2.0 (insecure)	SSL 3.0 (insecure)	TLS 1.0 (deprecated)	TLS 1.1 (deprecated)	TLS 1.2	TLS 1.3	EV certificate	SHA-2 certificate	ECDSA certificate	BEAST	CRIME	POODLE (SSLv3)	RC4	FREAK	Logjam	Protocol selection by user
Microsoft Internet Explorer (1–10) (Note: IE uses the TLS implementation of the Microsoft Windows operating system provided by the Schannel security support provider. TLS 1.1 and 1.2 are disabled by default until IE11.) Windows Schannel	1.x		Windows 3.1, 95, NT, (Note: Windows NT 3.1 supports IE 1–2, Windows NT 3.5 supports IE 1–3, Windows NT 3.51 and Windows NT 4.0 supports IE 1–6.) (Note: Windows XP as well as Server 2003 and older support only weak ciphers like Triple DES and RC4 out of the box. The weak ciphers of these Schannel version are not only used for IE, but also for other Microsoft products running on this OS, like Microsoft Office or Windows Update. Only Windows Server 2003 can get a manual update to support AES ciphers by KB948963); Mac OS 7, 8	No SSL/TLS support															
Microsoft Internet Explorer (1–10) Windows Schannel	2		Windows 3.1, 95, NT, Mac OS 7, 8	Yes	No	No	No	No	No	No	No	No	No SSL 3.0 or TLS support			Vulnerable	Vulnerable	Vulnerable	—N/a
Microsoft Internet Explorer (1–10) Windows Schannel	3		Windows 3.1, 95, NT, Mac OS 7, 8	Yes	Yes	No	No	No	No	No	No	No	Vulnerable	Not affected	Vulnerable	Vulnerable	Vulnerable	Vulnerable	?
Microsoft Internet Explorer (1–10) Windows Schannel	4, 5, 6		Windows 3.1, 95, 98, NT, 2000; Mac OS 7.1, 8, X, Solaris, HP-UX	Yes	Yes	Disabled by default	No	No	No	No	No	No	Vulnerable	Not affected	Vulnerable	Vulnerable	Vulnerable	Vulnerable	Yes
Microsoft Internet Explorer (1–10) Windows Schannel	6		Windows XP	Yes	Yes	Disabled by default	No	No	No	No	Yes (Since SP3) (Note: MS13-095 or MS14-049 for Windows Server 2003, Windows XP x64 and Windows XP SP3 (32-bit).)	No	Mitigated	Not affected	Vulnerable	Vulnerable	Vulnerable	Vulnerable	Yes
Microsoft Internet Explorer (1–10) Windows Schannel	7, 8		Windows XP	Disabled by default	Yes	Yes	No	No	No	Yes	Yes (Since SP3)	No	Mitigated	Not affected	Vulnerable	Vulnerable	Vulnerable	Vulnerable	Yes
Microsoft Internet Explorer (1–10) Windows Schannel	6		Server 2003	Yes	Yes	Disabled by default	No	No	No	No	Yes (KB938397+KB968730)	No	Mitigated	Not affected	Vulnerable	Vulnerable	Mitigated	Mitigated	Yes
Microsoft Internet Explorer (1–10) Windows Schannel	7, 8		Server 2003	Disabled by default	Yes	Yes	No	No	No	Yes	Yes (KB938397+KB968730)	No	Mitigated	Not affected	Vulnerable	Vulnerable	Mitigated	Mitigated	Yes
Microsoft Internet Explorer (1–10) Windows Schannel	7, 8, 9		Windows Vista	Disabled by default	Yes	Yes	No	No	No	Yes	Yes	Yes	Mitigated	Not affected	Vulnerable	Vulnerable	Mitigated	Mitigated	Yes
Microsoft Internet Explorer (1–10) Windows Schannel	7, 8, 9		Server 2008	Disabled by default	Yes	Yes	Disabled by default (KB4019276) (Note: DTLS protocol counterpart version, however, is not supported.)	Disabled by default (KB4019276)	No	Yes	Yes	Yes	Mitigated	Not affected	Vulnerable	Vulnerable	Mitigated	Mitigated	Yes
Microsoft Internet Explorer (1–10) Windows Schannel	8, 9, 10		7, 8 Server 2008 R2; Server 2012	Disabled by default	Yes	Yes	Disabled by default	Disabled by default	No	Yes	Yes	Yes	Mitigated	Not affected	Vulnerable	Lowest priority (Note: RC4 can be disabled except as a fallback (Only when no cipher suites with other than RC4 is available, cipher suites with RC4 will be used as a fallback).)	Mitigated	Mitigated	Yes
Internet Explorer 11 Windows Schannel	11 (Note: IE11 will continue to support these operating systems if they are with ESUs until at least October 13, 2026.)		7, 8.1; Server 2008 R2; Server 2012; Server 2012 R2	Disabled by default	Disabled by default (Note: Fallback to SSL 3.0 is sites blocked by default in Internet Explorer 11 for Protected Mode. SSL 3.0 is disabled by default in Internet Explorer 11 since April 2015.)	Disabled by default (Note: TLS 1.0 and 1.1 are disabled by default in Internet Explorer 11 and EdgeHTML since September 2022.)	Disabled by default	Yes	No	Yes	Yes	Yes	Mitigated	Not affected	Mitigated	Disabled by default	Mitigated	Mitigated	Yes
Browser or OS API	Version		Platforms	SSL 2.0 (insecure)	SSL 3.0 (insecure)	TLS 1.0 (deprecated)	TLS 1.1 (deprecated)	TLS 1.2	TLS 1.3	EV certificate	SHA-2 certificate	ECDSA certificate	BEAST	CRIME	POODLE (SSLv3)	RC4	FREAK	Logjam	Protocol selection by user
Microsoft Edge (12–18) (EdgeHTML-based) Client only Internet Explorer 11 Windows Schannel	11	12–13	Windows 10 1507–1511	Disabled by default	Yes	Yes	Yes	Yes	No	Yes	Yes	Yes	Mitigated	Not affected	Mitigated	Disabled by default	Mitigated	Mitigated	Yes
Microsoft Edge (12–18) (EdgeHTML-based) Client only Internet Explorer 11 Windows Schannel	11	14–18 (client only)	Windows 10 1607–2004; Windows Server (SAC); 1709–2004	No	Disabled by default	Yes	Yes	Yes	No	Yes	Yes	Yes	Mitigated	Not affected	Mitigated	Disabled by default	Mitigated	Mitigated	Yes
Internet Explorer 11 Windows Schannel	11 (Note: IE11 ran out of support for GAC (formerly CB and SAC) editions of Windows 10 since June 15, 2022.)		Windows 10 20H2–22H2; Windows Server (SAC); 20H2	No	Disabled by default	Disabled by default	Disabled by default	Yes	No	Yes	Yes	Yes	Mitigated	Not affected	Mitigated	Disabled by default	Mitigated	Mitigated	Yes
Windows Schannel	Windows 11 21H2–23H2 (Ent/Edu/Home/Pro)			No	Disabled by default	Disabled by default	Disabled by default	Yes	Yes	Yes	Yes	Yes	Mitigated	Not affected	Mitigated	Disabled by default	Mitigated	Mitigated	Yes
Windows Schannel	Windows 11 24H2 (Home/Pro)			No	Disabled by default	Disabled by default	Disabled by default	Yes	Yes	Yes	Yes	Yes	Mitigated	Not affected	Mitigated	Disabled by default	Mitigated	Mitigated	Yes
Windows Schannel	Windows 11 24H2 (Ent/Edu)			No	Disabled by default	Disabled by default	Disabled by default	Yes	Yes	Yes	Yes	Yes	Mitigated	Not affected	Mitigated	Disabled by default	Mitigated	Mitigated	Yes
Windows Schannel	Windows 11 25H2 (Home/Pro)			No	Disabled by default	Disabled by default	Disabled by default	Yes	Yes	Yes	Yes	Yes	Mitigated	Not affected	Mitigated	Disabled by default	Mitigated	Mitigated	Yes
Windows Schannel	Windows 11 25H2 (Ent/Edu)			No	Disabled by default	Disabled by default	Disabled by default	Yes	Yes	Yes	Yes	Yes	Mitigated	Not affected	Mitigated	Disabled by default	Mitigated	Mitigated	Yes
Windows Schannel	Windows 11 26H1 (Specific ARM SoCs only)			No	Disabled by default	Disabled by default	Disabled by default	Yes	Yes	Yes	Yes	Yes	Mitigated	Not affected	Mitigated	Disabled by default	Mitigated	Mitigated	Yes
Windows Schannel	Windows 11 26H2 (Ent/Edu/Home/Pro)			No	Disabled by default	Disabled by default	Disabled by default	Yes	Yes	Yes	Yes	Yes	Mitigated	Not affected	Mitigated	Disabled by default	Mitigated	Mitigated	Yes
Internet Explorer 11 LTSB/LTSC Windows Schannel LTSB/LTSC	11		Windows 10; LTSB 2015 (1507)	Disabled by default	Yes	Disabled by default	Disabled by default	Yes	No	Yes	Yes	Yes	Mitigated	Not affected	Mitigated	Disabled by default	Mitigated	Mitigated	Yes
Internet Explorer 11 LTSB/LTSC Windows Schannel LTSB/LTSC	11		Windows 10; LTSB 2016 (1607)	No	Disabled by default	Disabled by default	Disabled by default	Yes	No	Yes	Yes	Yes	Mitigated	Not affected	Mitigated	Disabled by default	Mitigated	Mitigated	Yes
Internet Explorer 11 LTSB/LTSC Windows Schannel LTSB/LTSC	11		Windows Server 2016 (LTSB/1607)	No	Disabled by default	Disabled by default	Disabled by default	Yes	No	Yes	Yes	Yes	Mitigated	Not affected	Mitigated	Disabled by default	Mitigated	Mitigated	Yes
Internet Explorer 11 LTSB/LTSC Windows Schannel LTSB/LTSC	11		Windows 10; LTSC 2019 (1809); Windows Server 2019 (LTSC/1809)	No	Disabled by default	Disabled by default	Disabled by default	Yes	No	Yes	Yes	Yes	Mitigated	Not affected	Mitigated	Disabled by default	Mitigated	Mitigated	Yes
Internet Explorer 11 LTSB/LTSC Windows Schannel LTSB/LTSC	11		Windows 10; LTSC 2021 (21H2)	No	Disabled by default	Disabled by default	Disabled by default	Yes	No	Yes	Yes	Yes	Mitigated	Not affected	Mitigated	Disabled by default	Mitigated	Mitigated	Yes
Internet Explorer 11 LTSB/LTSC Windows Schannel LTSB/LTSC	11		Windows Server 2022 (LTSC/21H2)	No	Disabled by default	Disabled by default	Disabled by default	Yes	Yes	Yes	Yes	Yes	Mitigated	Not affected	Mitigated	Disabled by default	Mitigated	Mitigated	Yes
Windows Schannel LTSC	Windows 11; LTSC 2024 (24H2)			No	Disabled by default	Disabled by default	Disabled by default	Yes	Yes	Yes	Yes	Yes	Mitigated	Not affected	Mitigated	Disabled by default	Mitigated	Mitigated	Yes
Windows Schannel LTSC	Windows Server 2025 (LTSC/24H2)			No	Disabled by default	Disabled by default	Disabled by default	Yes	Yes	Yes	Yes	Yes	Mitigated	Not affected	Mitigated	Disabled by default	Mitigated	Mitigated	Yes
Browser or OS API	Version		Platforms	SSL 2.0 (insecure)	SSL 3.0 (insecure)	TLS 1.0 (deprecated)	TLS 1.1 (deprecated)	TLS 1.2	TLS 1.3	EV certificate	SHA-2 certificate	ECDSA certificate	BEAST	CRIME	POODLE (SSLv3)	RC4	FREAK	Logjam	Protocol selection by user
Microsoft Internet Explorer Mobile	7–9		Windows Phone 7, 7.5, 7.8	Disabled by default	Yes	Yes	No	No	No	No	Yes	Yes	?	Not affected	Vulnerable	Vulnerable	Vulnerable	Vulnerable	Only with 3rd party tools (Note: Could be disabled via registry editing but need 3rd Party tools to do this.)
Microsoft Internet Explorer Mobile	10		Windows Phone 8	Disabled by default	Yes	Yes	Disabled by default	Disabled by default	No	No	Yes	Yes	Mitigated	Not affected	Vulnerable	Vulnerable	Vulnerable	Vulnerable	Only with 3rd party tools
Microsoft Internet Explorer Mobile	11		Windows Phone 8.1	Disabled by default	Yes	Yes	Yes	Yes	No	No	Yes	Yes	Mitigated	Not affected	Vulnerable	Only as fallback	Vulnerable	Vulnerable	Only with 3rd party tools
Microsoft Edge (13–15) (EdgeHTML-based) (Note: Edge (formerly known as Project Spartan) is based on a fork of the Internet Explorer 11 rendering engine.)	13		Windows 10 Mobile 1511	Disabled by default	Disabled by default	Yes	Yes	Yes	No	Yes	Yes	Yes	Mitigated	Not affected	Mitigated	Disabled by default	Mitigated	Mitigated	No
Microsoft Edge (13–15) (EdgeHTML-based)	14, 15		Windows 10 Mobile; 1607–1709	No	Disabled by default	Yes	Yes	Yes	No	Yes	Yes	Yes	Mitigated	Not affected	Mitigated	Disabled by default	Mitigated	Mitigated	No
Browser or OS API	Version		Platforms	SSL 2.0 (insecure)	SSL 3.0 (insecure)	TLS 1.0 (deprecated)	TLS 1.1 (deprecated)	TLS 1.2	TLS 1.3	EV certificate	SHA-2 certificate	ECDSA certificate	BEAST	CRIME	POODLE (SSLv3)	RC4	FREAK	Logjam	Protocol selection by user
Apple Safari (Note: Safari uses the operating system implementation on Mac OS X, Windows (XP, Vista, 7) with unknown version, Safari 5 is the last version available for Windows. OS X 10.8 on have SecureTransport support for TLS 1.1 and 1.2 Qualys SSL report simulates Safari 5.1.9 connecting with TLS 1.0 not 1.1 or 1.2.)	1		Mac OS X 10.2, 10.3	No	Yes	Yes	No	No	No	No	No	No	Vulnerable	Not affected	Vulnerable	Vulnerable	Vulnerable	Vulnerable	No
Apple Safari	2–5		Mac OS X 10.4, 10.5, Win XP	No	Yes	Yes	No	No	No	Yes (Since v3.2)	No	No	Vulnerable	Not affected	Vulnerable	Vulnerable	Vulnerable	Vulnerable	No
Apple Safari	3–5		Vista, Win 7	No	Yes	Yes	No	No	No	Yes (Since v3.2)	No	Yes	Vulnerable	Not affected	Vulnerable	Vulnerable	Vulnerable	Vulnerable	No
Apple Safari	4–6		Mac OS X 10.6, 10.7	No	Yes	Yes	No	No	No	Yes	Yes	Yes	Vulnerable	Not affected	Vulnerable	Vulnerable	Vulnerable	Vulnerable	No
Apple Safari	6		OS X 10.8	No	Yes	Yes	No	No	No	Yes	Yes	Yes	Mitigated (Note: In September 2013, Apple implemented BEAST mitigation in OS X 10.8 (Mountain Lion), but it was not turned on by default, resulting in Safari still being theoretically vulnerable to the BEAST attack on that platform. BEAST mitigation has been enabled by default from OS X 10.8.5 updated in February 2014.)	Not affected	Mitigated (Note: Because Apple removed support for all CBC protocols in SSL 3.0 to mitigate POODLE, this leaves only RC4, which is also completely broken by the RC4 attacks in SSL 3.0.)	Vulnerable	Mitigated	Vulnerable	No
Apple Safari	7, 9		OS X 10.9	No	Yes	Yes	Yes	Yes	No	Yes	Yes	Yes	Mitigated	Not affected	Mitigated	Vulnerable	Mitigated	Vulnerable	No
Apple Safari	8–10		OS X 10.10	No	Yes	Yes	Yes	Yes	No	Yes	Yes	Yes	Mitigated	Not affected	Mitigated	Lowest priority	Mitigated	Mitigated	No
Apple Safari	9–11		OS X 10.11	No	No	Yes	Yes	Yes	No	Yes	Yes	Yes	Mitigated	Not affected	Not affected	Lowest priority	Mitigated	Mitigated	No
Apple Safari	10–13		macOS; 10.12, 10.13	No	No	Yes	Yes	Yes	No	Yes	Yes	Yes	Mitigated	Not affected	Not affected	Disabled by default	Mitigated	Mitigated	No
Apple Safari	12–14		macOS 10.14	No	No	Yes	Yes	Yes	Yes (Since macOS 10.14.4)	Yes	Yes	Yes	Mitigated	Not affected	Not affected	Disabled by default	Mitigated	Mitigated	No
Apple Safari	13–26		macOS 10.15, 11, 12, 13, 14	No	No	Yes	Yes	Yes	Yes	Yes	Yes	Yes	Mitigated	Not affected	Not affected	Disabled by default	Mitigated	Mitigated	No
Apple Safari	18–26	27	macOS 15	No	No	Yes	Yes	Yes	Yes	Yes	Yes	Yes	Mitigated	Not affected	Not affected	Disabled by default	Mitigated	Mitigated	No
Apple Safari	26	27	macOS 26	No	No	Disabled by default	Disabled by default	Yes	Yes	Yes	Yes	Yes	Mitigated	Not affected	Not affected	Disabled by default	Mitigated	Mitigated	No
Apple Safari	27		macOS 27	No	No	Disabled by default	Disabled by default	Yes	Yes	Yes	Yes	Yes	Mitigated	Not affected	Not affected	Disabled by default	Mitigated	Mitigated	No
Browser or OS API	Version		Platforms	SSL 2.0 (insecure)	SSL 3.0 (insecure)	TLS 1.0 (deprecated)	TLS 1.1 (deprecated)	TLS 1.2	TLS 1.3	EV certificate	SHA-2 certificate	ECDSA certificate	BEAST	CRIME	POODLE (SSLv3)	RC4	FREAK	Logjam	Protocol selection by user
Apple Safari (mobile) (Note: Mobile Safari and third-party software utilizing the system UIWebView library use the iOS operating system implementation, which supports TLS 1.2 as of iOS 5.0.)	3		iPhone OS 1, 2	No	Yes	Yes	No	No	No	No	No	No	Vulnerable	Not affected	Vulnerable	Vulnerable	Vulnerable	Vulnerable	No
Apple Safari (mobile)	4, 5		iPhone OS 3, iOS 4	No	Yes	Yes	No	No	No	Yes	Yes	Yes (Since iOS 4)	Vulnerable	Not affected	Vulnerable	Vulnerable	Vulnerable	Vulnerable	No
Apple Safari (mobile)	5, 6		iOS 5, 6	No	Yes	Yes	Yes	Yes	No	Yes	Yes	Yes	Vulnerable	Not affected	Vulnerable	Vulnerable	Vulnerable	Vulnerable	No
Apple Safari (mobile)	7		iOS 7	No	Yes	Yes	Yes	Yes	No	Yes	Yes	Yes	Mitigated	Not affected	Vulnerable	Vulnerable	Vulnerable	Vulnerable	No
Apple Safari (mobile)	8		iOS 8	No	Yes	Yes	Yes	Yes	No	Yes	Yes	Yes	Mitigated	Not affected	Mitigated	Lowest priority	Mitigated	Mitigated	No
Apple Safari (mobile)	9		iOS 9	No	No	Yes	Yes	Yes	No	Yes	Yes	Yes	Mitigated	Not affected	Not affected	Lowest priority	Mitigated	Mitigated	No
Apple Safari (mobile)	10, 11		iOS 10, 11	No	No	Yes	Yes	Yes	No	Yes	Yes	Yes	Mitigated	Not affected	Not affected	Disabled by default	Mitigated	Mitigated	No
Apple Safari (mobile)	12		iOS 12	No	No	Yes	Yes	Yes	Yes (Since iOS 12.2)	Yes	Yes	Yes	Mitigated	Not affected	Not affected	Disabled by default	Mitigated	Mitigated	No
Apple Safari (mobile)	13–17		iOS; 13–17	No	No	Yes	Yes	Yes	Yes	Yes	Yes	Yes	Mitigated	Not affected	Not affected	Disabled by default	Mitigated	Mitigated	No
Apple Safari (mobile)	13–17		iPadOS; 13–17	No	No	Yes	Yes	Yes	Yes	Yes	Yes	Yes	Mitigated	Not affected	Not affected	Disabled by default	Mitigated	Mitigated	No
Apple Safari (mobile)	18		iOS 18	No	No	Yes	Yes	Yes	Yes	Yes	Yes	Yes	Mitigated	Not affected	Not affected	Disabled by default	Mitigated	Mitigated	No
Apple Safari (mobile)	18		iPadOS 18	No	No	Yes	Yes	Yes	Yes	Yes	Yes	Yes	Mitigated	Not affected	Not affected	Disabled by default	Mitigated	Mitigated	No
Apple Safari (mobile)	26		iOS 26	No	No	Disabled by default	Disabled by default	Yes	Yes	Yes	Yes	Yes	Mitigated	Not affected	Not affected	Disabled by default	Mitigated	Mitigated	No
Apple Safari (mobile)	26		iPadOS 26	No	No	Disabled by default	Disabled by default	Yes	Yes	Yes	Yes	Yes	Mitigated	Not affected	Not affected	Disabled by default	Mitigated	Mitigated	No
Apple Safari (mobile)	27		iOS 27	No	No	Disabled by default	Disabled by default	Yes	Yes	Yes	Yes	Yes	Mitigated	Not affected	Not affected	Disabled by default	Mitigated	Mitigated	No
Apple Safari (mobile)	27		iPadOS 27	No	No	Disabled by default	Disabled by default	Yes	Yes	Yes	Yes	Yes	Mitigated	Not affected	Not affected	Disabled by default	Mitigated	Mitigated	No
Browser or OS API	Version		Platforms	SSL 2.0 (insecure)	SSL 3.0 (insecure)	TLS 1.0 (deprecated)	TLS 1.1 (deprecated)	TLS 1.2	TLS 1.3	EV	SHA-2	ECDSA	BEAST	CRIME	POODLE (SSLv3)	RC4	FREAK	Logjam	Protocol selection by user
Google Android OS	Android 1.0–4.0.4			No	Yes	Yes	No	No	No	?	Yes	Yes (Since 3.0)	?	?	Vulnerable	Vulnerable	Vulnerable	Vulnerable	No
Google Android OS	Android 4.1–4.4.4			No	Yes	Yes	Disabled by default	Disabled by default	No	?	Yes	Yes	?	?	Vulnerable	Vulnerable	Vulnerable	Vulnerable	No
Google Android OS	Android 5.0–5.0.2			No	Yes	Yes	Yes	Yes	No	?	Yes	Yes	?	?	Vulnerable	Vulnerable	Vulnerable	Vulnerable	No
Google Android OS	Android 5.1–5.1.1			No	Disabled by default	Yes	Yes	Yes	No	?	Yes	Yes	?	?	Not affected	Only as fallback	Mitigated	Mitigated	No
Google Android OS	Android 6.0–7.1.2			No	Disabled by default	Yes	Yes	Yes	No	?	Yes	Yes	?	?	Not affected	Disabled by default	Mitigated	Mitigated	No
Google Android OS	Android 8.0–9			No	No	Yes	Yes	Yes	No	?	Yes	Yes	?	?	Not affected	Disabled by default	Mitigated	Mitigated	No
Google Android OS	Android 10–13			No	No	Yes	Yes	Yes	Yes	?	Yes	Yes	?	?	Not affected	Disabled by default	Mitigated	Mitigated	No
Google Android OS	Android 14			No	No	Yes	Yes	Yes	Yes	?	Yes	Yes	?	?	Not affected	Disabled by default	Mitigated	Mitigated	No
Google Android OS	Android 15			No	No	Disabled by default	Disabled by default	Yes	Yes	?	Yes	Yes	?	?	Not affected	Disabled by default	Mitigated	Mitigated	No
Google Android OS	Android 16			No	No	Disabled by default	Disabled by default	Yes	Yes	?	Yes	Yes	?	?	Not affected	Disabled by default	Mitigated	Mitigated	No
Google Android OS	Android 17			No	No	Disabled by default	Disabled by default	Yes	Yes	?	Yes	Yes	?	?	Not affected	Disabled by default	Mitigated	Mitigated	No
Browser or OS API	Version		Platforms	SSL 2.0 (insecure)	SSL 3.0 (insecure)	TLS 1.0 (deprecated)	TLS 1.1 (deprecated)	TLS 1.2	TLS 1.3	EV certificate	SHA-2 certificate	ECDSA certificate	BEAST	CRIME	POODLE (SSLv3)	RC4	FREAK	Logjam	Protocol selection by user

Color or Note		Significance
Browser version	Platform	Significance
Browser version	Operating system	Future release; under development
Browser version	Operating system	Current latest release
Browser version	Operating system	Former release; still supported
Browser version	Operating system	Former release; long-term support still active, but will end in less than 12 months
Browser version	Operating system	Former release; no longer supported
—N/a	Operating system	Mixed/Unspecified
—N/a	Operating system (Version+)	Minimum required operating system version (for supported versions of the browser)
—N/a	~~Operating system~~	No longer supported for this operating system
