= History of Internet Explorer =

Market share of Internet Explorer, 1995–2024

Microsoft developed 11 versions of Internet Explorer for Windows from 1995 to 2013, as well as Internet Explorer for Mac, Internet Explorer for UNIX, and Internet Explorer Mobile.

== Beginnings and Spyglass Mosaic (1995–1997) ==
The first Internet Explorer was derived from Spyglass Mosaic. The original Mosaic came from NCSA, but since NCSA was a public entity, it relied on Spyglass as its commercial licensing partner. Spyglass in turn delivered two versions of the Mosaic browser to Microsoft, one wholly based on the NCSA source code, and another engineered from scratch but conceptually modeled on the NCSA browser. Internet Explorer was initially built using the Spyglass, not the NCSA source code. The license to Microsoft provided Spyglass (and thus NCSA) with a quarterly fee plus a percentage of Microsoft's revenues for the software.

The browser was then modified and released as Internet Explorer. Microsoft originally released Internet Explorer 1.0 in August 1995 in two packages: at retail in the Microsoft Plus! add-on for Windows 95 and via the simultaneous OEM release of Windows 95. Version 1.5 was released several months later for Windows NT, with support for basic table rendering, an important early web standard. Version 2.0 was released for both Windows 95 and Windows NT in November 1995, featuring support for SSL, cookies, VRML, and Internet newsgroups. Version 2.0 was also released for the Macintosh and Windows 3.1 in April 1996. Version 2 was also included in Microsoft's Internet Starter Kit for Windows 95 in early 1996, which retailed for US$19.99 (~$41.00 in 2025) and included a how-to book and 30 days of Internet access on MSN among other features.

Internet Explorer 3.0 was released free of charge in August 1996 by bundling it with Windows 95, another OEM release. Microsoft thus made no direct revenues on IE and was liable to pay Spyglass only the minimum quarterly fee. In 1997, Spyglass threatened Microsoft with a contractual audit, in response to which Microsoft settled for US$8 million (~$14.9 million in 2025). Version 3 included Internet Mail and News 1.0 and the Windows Address Book. It also brought the browser much closer to the bar that had been set by Netscape, including the support of Netscape's plugins technology (NPAPI), ActiveX, frames, and a reverse-engineered version of JavaScript named JScript. Later, Microsoft NetMeeting and Windows Media Player were integrated into the product and thus helper applications became not as necessary as they once were. Cascading Style Sheets (CSS) were also introduced with version 3 of Internet Explorer.

== The browser wars (1997–2003) ==
Internet Explorer 4.0

Version 4, released in September 1997, was shipped with Windows 95 OSR (OEM Service Release) 2.5, and the latest beta version of Windows 98 and was modified to integrate more closely with Microsoft Windows. It included an option to enable "Active Desktop" which displayed World Wide Web content on the desktop itself and was updated automatically as the content changed. The user could select other pages for use as Active Desktops as well. "Active Channel" technology was also introduced to automatically obtain information updates from websites. The technology was based on an XML standard known as Channel Definition Format (CDF), which predated web syndication formats like RSS. This version was designed to work on Windows 95, Windows 98, and Windows NT, and could be downloaded from the Internet, free of charge. It supported Dynamic HTML (DHTML). Outlook Express 4.0 also came integrated into the browser and replaced the aging Microsoft Internet Mail & News product that was released with previous versions. Version 5 came out in March 1999, following Microsoft's release of Internet Explorer 5.0 Beta versions in late 1998. Bi-directional text, ruby text and direct XML/XSLT support were included in this release, along with enhanced support for CSS Level 1 and 2. In September, it was released with Windows 98. Version 5.0 was the last one to be released for Windows 3.1x or Windows NT 3.x. Internet Explorer 5.5 was later released for Windows Me in July 2000, and included many bug fixes and security patches. Version 5.5 was the last to have Compatibility Mode, which allowed Internet Explorer 4 to be run side by side with the 5.x. With IE6, there was a quirks mode that could be triggered to make it behave like IE 5.5. Version 6 was released with Windows XP on August 27, 2001. It mainly focused on privacy and security features, as they had become customer priorities, such as P3P.

=== United States v. Microsoft ===
In a legal case brought by the US Department of Justice and twenty U.S. states, Microsoft was accused of breaking an earlier consent decree, by bundling Internet Explorer with its operating system software. The department took issue with Microsoft's contract with OEM computer manufacturers that bound the manufacturers to include Internet Explorer with the copies of Microsoft Windows they installed on systems they shipped. It would not allow the manufacturer to put an icon for any other web browser on the default desktop in place of Internet Explorer. Microsoft maintained that integration of its web browser into its operating system was in the interests of consumers.

Microsoft asserted in court that IE was integrated with Windows 98, and that Windows 98 could not be made to operate without it. Australian computer scientist Shane Brooks later demonstrated that Windows 98 could in fact run with IE files removed. Brooks went on to develop software designed to customize Windows by removing "undesired components", which is now known as LitePC. Microsoft has claimed that the software did not remove all components of Internet Explorer, leaving many dynamic link library files behind.

On April 3, 2000, Judge Jackson issued his findings of fact that Microsoft had abused its monopoly position by attempting to "dissuade Netscape from developing Navigator as a platform", that it "withheld crucial technical information", and attempted to reduce Navigator's usage share by "giving Internet Explorer away and rewarding firms that helped build its usage share" and "excluding Navigator from important distribution channels".

Jackson also released a remedy that suggested Microsoft should be broken up into two companies. This remedy was overturned on appeal, amidst charges that Jackson had revealed a bias against Microsoft in communication with reporters. The findings of fact that Microsoft had broken the law, however, were upheld. Seven months later, the Department of Justice agreed to a settlement agreement with Microsoft. As of 2004, although nineteen states have agreed to the settlement, Massachusetts is still holding out.

== Hiatus and security troubles (2003–2006) ==
Internet Explorer 6.0

Market share for February, 2005
IE4 – 0.07%
IE5 – 6.17%
IE6 – 82.79%

In a May 7, 2003 Microsoft online chat, Brian Countryman, Internet Explorer Program Manager, declared that on Microsoft Windows, Internet Explorer would cease to be distributed separately from the operating system (IE 6 being the last standalone version); it would, however, be continued as a part of the evolution of the operating system, with updates coming bundled in operating system upgrades. Thus, Internet Explorer and Windows itself would be kept more in sync.

New feature work did continue in 2003 during the development of Windows Vista; a preview release was released at the Professional Developers Conference in October 2003 which contained an updated Internet Explorer. New features noted by reviewers included a download manager, pop-up blocker, add-on manager and a tool to clear browsing history. With the exception of the download manager, which was eventually discarded, these features all appeared in builds of Internet Explorer included with preview builds of Windows XP Service Pack 2 a few months later.

Windows XP Service Pack 2, which was released in August 2004 after a number of delays, also contained a number of security-related fixes, new restrictions on code execution, and user interface elements that aimed to better protect the user from malware. One notable user interface element that was introduced was the "information bar". Tony Schriner, a developer on the Internet Explorer team, explained that the information bar was introduced to reduce the possibility that the user might mis-click and allow the installation of software they did not intend, as well as to simply reduce the number of pop-ups displayed to the user. Most reviews of this release focused on the addition of the pop-up blocker, as it had been seen as a major omission at a time when pop-up ads had become a major source of irritation for web users.

On December 19, 2005, Microsoft announced that it would no longer support Internet Explorer for the Macintosh, and recommended using other Macintosh browsers such as Safari.

== New competition (2006–2014) ==
From 2006 to 2009 Internet Explorer market share slowly declined, and the policy change (announced in 2003) of only releasing new versions with new versions of the Windows operating system was reversed with plans for IE7. In 2006, five years after the release of IE 6, beta versions of Version 7.0 were released, and version 7 was released that October (the same month as Firefox 2.0). Internet Explorer was renamed Windows Internet Explorer, as part of Microsoft's rebranding of component names that are included with Windows. It was available as part of Windows Vista, and as a separate download via Microsoft Update for Windows XP with Service Pack 2 and Windows Server 2003 Service Pack 1. Internet Explorer 7 was also available for download directly from Microsoft's website. Large amounts of the underlying architecture, including the rendering engine and security framework, had been completely overhauled. Partly as a result of security enhancements, the browser became a stand-alone application, rather than integrated with the Windows shell, and was no longer capable of acting as a file browser, but despite that the first vulnerability in Internet Explorer 7 was posted 6 days after its release. In March 2009 Version 8.0 was released, with the first public beta having been released on March 5, 2008. IE8 offered better support for web standards than previous versions, with plans for improved support for RSS, CSS, and Ajax, as well as full compliance with CSS 2.1. It was also the first version to successfully pass the Acid2 test. In addition, Internet Explorer 8 included new features such as WebSlices, color-coded tab groups and an improved phishing filter.

With Google's popular Chrome browser steadily gaining popularity due to its speed, simplicity, and support of newer technologies like HTML5, Microsoft released Internet Explorer 9 on March 14, 2011, marketing it as showcasing the "Beauty of the Web". Internet Explorer 9 offered features intended to enhance web browsing, such as partial HTML5 support, hardware acceleration, and better Windows integration. Adobe released a beta version of Flash 10.2 tailored to take advantage of Internet Explorer 9's built-in hardware acceleration capabilities on November 30, 2010. Microsoft tried to make Internet Explorer simpler to use, adding many features from competing browsers (namely Google Chrome, Firefox, or Opera) such as the ability to drag URLs and bookmarks to the Windows Taskbar, a unified download manager, a redesigned new tab page featuring the user's most recently visited sites, and the ability to "tear" tabs away from a window, or drag them away vertically to create their own window.

When it was released, Internet Explorer 9 required Windows Vista SP2 or later, in a time when 44% of computers still ran Windows XP. The marketing strategy and lack of cross-platform support was met with criticism, and backfired with Microsoft Edge [Legacy]'s slow adoption on Windows 10. Google Chrome imposed no such restrictions, supporting Windows XP until 2016.

Internet Explorer 10 was released with Windows 8 in 2012, adding a touch-oriented Windows 8 interface alongside the desktop browser and improved web-standards support. Internet Explorer 11 shipped with Windows 8.1 in 2013, with Microsoft highlighting touch performance, speed improvements, and synchronization of browsing history, favorites, and settings across Windows 8.1 devices.

== Microsoft Edge Legacy (2014–2021) ==
Windows 10 was announced in a media event on September 30, 2014. During the event, a successor to Internet Explorer was announced, under the codename "Project Spartan".

Later, the new interface and render engine for Project Spartan were leaked to Insiders in a developer preview of Windows 10, which could be enabled in Internet Explorer. On the same date as the launch of the new interface, a page on Microsoft's website announced the new name for Project Spartan was Microsoft Edge (later renamed Microsoft Edge Legacy).

Windows 10 was released on July 29, 2015, as a free upgrade to existing Windows 8.1 and Windows 7 customers. While Microsoft Edge [Legacy] was featured front-and-center, Internet Explorer 11 remains available to use in the new OS for compatibility purposes, although it is hidden in the Windows Accessories folder. A notable trace of Internet Explorer still exists in that the platform version number of the EdgeHTML rendering engine in the first release, version 12, clearly continues the numbering scheme of the predecessor Trident engine used in IE.

Microsoft Edge Legacy was superseded by "The New Microsoft Edge", based on the Chromium open-source project, on January 15, 2020, effectively ending the Internet Explorer lineage. Edge Legacy did, however, continue to be supported on desktop, until March 9, 2021. While Xbox System Software support ended in September 2021, when it was replaced by New Edge.

== End-of-life (2021–2032) ==
First announced in 2021, on Semi-Annual Channel (SAC) versions of Windows 10, Internet Explorer support ended on June 15, 2022, and it was permanently disabled on February 14, 2023. Any remaining icons or shortcuts were due to be removed on June 13, 2023, however, on May 19, 2023, various organizations disapproved, leading Microsoft to withdraw the change. Furthermore, despite Microsoft's alleged permanent IE11 disablement, IE11 can still be accessed in some capacity, using unofficial methods.

IE Mode, a feature of "The New Microsoft Edge", enables Edge to display web pages using Internet Explorer 11's Trident layout engine and other core components. Through IE Mode, the underlying technology of Internet Explorer 11 partially exists on Windows that do not support Internet Explorer as a proper application, such as Windows 11 and later versions that derive from the Windows 11 codebase. Microsoft has announced support for IE Mode through at least 2029, with a one-year advance notice prior to retiring this variant of IE11.

Final Internet Explorer support will end on January 13, 2032, concurrent with the end of support for Windows 10 IoT Enterprise LTSC 2021, barring any additional changes to the support policy.

== Market adoption and usage share ==
Usage share of web browsers according to StatCounter, 2009–2025

Internet Explorer's market share was closely related to Microsoft Windows's market share as it was its default web browser. After the integration of Internet Explorer 2.0 with Windows 95 in 1996, and especially after version 4.0's release in 1997, adoption skyrocketed from below 10% in 1996 to about 40% in 1998 and over 80% in 2000.

Ultimately Internet Explorer beat out its rival Netscape in the browser wars of the late 1990s and by 2002 dominated the market, peaking at around 95% percent market share in 2002-2003, after which its market share declined at a slow but steady pace. Usage was higher in Asia and lower in Europe.

The next period saw Firefox as the main competitor, with new Firefox versions sometimes surpassing old IE versions in market share, with IE overall always maintaining a majority.

Ultimately, Internet Explorer's marketshare fell below 50% around 2010 and Google Chrome replaced it as the most used browser worldwide in 2012.

=== Desktop market share by year and version ===
Approximate usage over time based on various usage share counters averaged for the year overall, or for the fourth quarter, or for the last month in the year depending on availability of reference.

	Total	IE11	IE10	IE9	IE8	IE7	IE6	IE5	IE4	IE3	IE2	IE1
2013	56.73%▲	1.25%▲	11.00%▲	13.89%▼	22.41%▼	1.72%▼	5.74%▼	0.02%▲	0.13%▲	0%	0%	0%
2012	53.77%▼	–	0.14%▲	16.77%▲	25.87%▼	3.49%▼	6.81%▼	0%▼	0.01%▲	0%	0%	0%
2011	56.24%▼	–	–	5.30%▲	32.36%▲	7.00%▼	10.19%▼	0.01%▼	0%	0%	0%	0%
2010	60.04%▼	–	–	–	29.43% ▲	11.61% ▼	16.79% ▼	0.02% ▼	0%	0%	0%	0%
2009	66.92%▼	–	–	–	10.40% ▲	26.10% ▼	27.40% ▲	0.08% ▼	0%▼	0%	0%	0%
2008	72.65% ▼	–	–	–	0.34% ▲	46.06% ▲	26.20% ▼	0.15% ▼	0.01% ▼	0%	0%	0%
2007	78.60% ▼	–	–	–	–	45.50% ▲	32.64% ▼	0.45% ▼	0.01% ▼	0%	0%	0%
2006	83.30% ▼	–	–	–	–	3.49% ▲	78.08% ▼	1.42% ▼	0.02% ▼	0%	0%	0%
2005	87.12% ▼	–	–	–	–	–	82.71% ▼	4.35% ▼	0.06% ▼	0%	0%	0%
2004	91.27% ▼	–	–	–	–	–	83.39% ▲	7.77% ▼	0.10% ▼	0%	0%	0%
2003	94.43% ▲	–	–	–	–	–	59.00% ▲	34.00% ▼	1.00% ▼	0%	0%	0%
2002	93.94% ▲	–	–	–	–	–	50.00% ▲	41.00% ▼	1.00% ▼	0%	0%	0%
2001	90.83% ▲	–	–	–	–	–	19.00% ▲	68.00% ▼	5.00% ▼	0%	0%	0%
2000	83.95% ▲	–	–	–	–	–	–	71.00% ▲	13.00% ▼	0% ▼	0%	0%
1999	75.31% ▲	–	–	–	–	–	–	41.00% ▲	36.00% ▼	1.00%	0%	0%
1998	45.00% ▲	–	–	–	–	–	–	–	? ▲	?	?	?
1997	39.40% ▲	–	–	–	–	–	–	–	? ▲	?	?	?
1996	20.00% ▲	–	–	–	–	–	–	–	–	?	?	?
1995	2.90% ▲	–	–	–	–	–	–	–	–	–	?	?

== See also ==
- Internet Explorer
- Internet Explorer version history
- Features of Internet Explorer
