= Internet Explorer version history =

Internet Explorer (formerly Microsoft Internet Explorer and Windows Internet Explorer, commonly abbreviated IE or MSIE) is a series of graphical web browsers developed by Microsoft and included as part of the Microsoft Windows line of operating systems, starting in 1995.

The first version of Internet Explorer, made its debut on August 24, 1995. It was a reworked version of Spyglass Mosaic, which Microsoft licensed from Spyglass Inc., like many other companies initiating browser development. It was first released as part of the add-on package Plus! for Windows 95 that year. Later versions were available as free downloads, or in service packs, and included in the OEM service releases of Windows 95 and later versions of Windows.

Originally Internet Explorer only ran on Windows using an Intel compatible (x86) processor. Current versions also run on x64, 32-bit ARMv7, PowerPC and IA-64. Versions on Windows have supported MIPS, Alpha AXP and 16-bit and 32-bit x86 but currently support only 32-bit or 64-bit. A version exists for Xbox 360 called Internet Explorer for Xbox using PowerPC and an embedded OEM version called Pocket Internet Explorer, later rebranded Internet Explorer Mobile, which is currently based on Internet Explorer 9 and made for Windows Phone using ARMv7, Windows CE, and previously, based on Internet Explorer 7 for Windows Mobile. It remains in development alongside the desktop versions.

Internet Explorer has supported other operating systems with Internet Explorer for Mac (using Motorola 68020+, PowerPC) and Internet Explorer for UNIX (Solaris using SPARC and HP-UX using PA-RISC), which have been discontinued.

Since its first release, Microsoft has added features and technologies such as basic table display (in version 1.5); XMLHttpRequest (in version 5), which adds creation of dynamic web pages; and Internationalized Domain Names (in version 7), which allow Web sites to have native-language addresses with non-Latin characters. The browser has also received scrutiny throughout its development for use of third-party technology (such as the source code of Spyglass Mosaic, used without royalty in early versions) and security and privacy vulnerabilities, and both the United States and the European Union have alleged that integration of Internet Explorer with Windows has been to the detriment of other browsers.

Internet Explorer 10 and 11 on Windows 8.x have two interfaces, one for traditional desktop use and another for tablet/touchscreen use.

== OS compatibility ==
IE versions, over time, have had widely varying OS compatibility, ranging from being available for many platforms and several versions of Windows to only a few versions of Windows. Many versions of IE had some support for an older OS but stopped getting updates. The increased growth of the Internet in the 1990s and 2000s means that current browsers with small market shares have more total users than the entire market early on. For example, 90% market share in 1997 would be roughly 60 million users, but by the start of 2007 90% market share would equate to over 900 million users. The result is that later versions of IE6 had many more users in total than all the early versions put together.

The release of IE7 at the end of 2006 resulted in a collapse of IE6 market share; by February 2007, market version share statistics showed IE6 at about 50% and IE7 at 29%. Regardless of the actual market share, the most compatible version (across operating systems) of IE was 5.x, which had Mac OS 9 and Mac OS X, Unix, and most Windows versions available and supported for a short period in the late 1990s (although 4.x had a more unified codebase across versions). By 2007, IE had much narrower OS support, with the latest versions supporting only Windows XP SP2 and above. Internet Explorer 5.0, 5.5, 6, and 7 (Experimental) have also been unofficially ported to the Linux operating system from the project IEs4Linux.

Availability on desktop operating systems
Operating system		Latest stable IE version	Support date	Exceptions
Microsoft Windows	7 or later, Server 2008 R2 or later	11.0.1000	2009–	Continued to receive security patches. IE11 was later released for Windows Embedded 8 Standard and Server 2012. Windows Server 2012 continued to receive security patches until 2026 with ESU
Microsoft Windows	8	10.0.185	2012	
Microsoft Windows	Vista and Server 2008	9.0.365	2006–2011	Windows Server 2008 continued to receive security patches until 2023 with ESU (and continued until 2026 with ESU for Azure and Premium Assurance customers)
Microsoft Windows	XP and Server 2003	8.0.6001.18702	2001–2009	Windows Embedded POSReady 2009 continued to receive security patches until 2019
Microsoft Windows	NT 4.0, 98, 2000 and ME	6.0 SP1	1996–2001	
Microsoft Windows	95	5.5 SP2	1995–2000	
Microsoft Windows	3.1 and NT 3.51	5.01 SP2	1995–1999	
Microsoft Windows	NT 3.5	3.03 SP1	1995–1996	
Microsoft Windows	NT 3.1	2.01	1995	
macOS	10.4–10.6 (IA-32, x64)	5.2.3 (with Rosetta)	2005	
macOS	10.1–10.5 (PPC)	5.2.3	2001–2003	
Classic Mac OS	7.5.5–9.2.2 (PPC)	5.1.7 (included)	1995–2003	
Classic Mac OS	7.1–8.1 (68k)	4.0.1 (included)	1995–1998	
Classic Mac OS	7.0.1 (68k)	2.1	1995	
OS/2	2.1–4.52	3.0	?	
HP-UX		5.01 SP1	?	
Solaris		5.01 SP1	1995–2001	

== Versions ==
=== Microsoft Internet Explorer 1 ===
Internet Explorer 1 screenshot

Microsoft Internet Explorer 1 made its debut on August 24, 1995. It was a reworked version of Spyglass Mosaic which Microsoft had licensed, like many other companies initiating browser development, from Spyglass Inc. It came with the purchase of Microsoft Plus! for Windows 95 and with at least some OEM releases of Windows 95 without Plus!. It was installed as part of the Internet Jumpstart Kit in Plus! for Windows 95. The Internet Explorer team began with about six people in early development. Version 1.5 was released in fall 1995 for Windows NT and added support for basic HTML table rendering. By including it free of charge on their operating system, they did not have to pay royalties to Spyglass Inc, resulting in a lawsuit and a US$8 million settlement on January 22, 1997.

Although not included, this software can also be installed on the original release of Windows 95.

Internet Explorer 1 is no longer supported, or available for download from Microsoft. However, archived versions of the software can be found on various websites. Support for Internet Explorer 1 ended on December 31, 2001, the same day as older Windows versions.

==== Features ====
Internet Explorer came with an install routine replacing a manual installation required by many of the existing web browsers.

=== Microsoft Internet Explorer 2 ===
Microsoft Internet Explorer 2 was released on November 27, 1995 (following a beta in October). It featured support for JavaScript, SSL, cookies, frames, VRML, RSA, and Internet newsgroups. Version 2 was also the first release for Windows 3.1 and Macintosh System 7.0.1 (PPC or 68k), although the Mac version was not released until January 1996 for PPC, and April for 68k. Version 2.1 for the Mac came out in August 1996, although by this time, Windows was getting version 3. Version 2 was included in Windows 95 OSR1, Windows NT 4.0 and Microsoft's Internet Starter Kit. It launched with twelve languages, including English, but by April 1996, this was expanded to 24, 20, and 9 for Windows, and Mac, respectively. The 2.0i version supported double-byte character-set. It is the last version of Internet Explorer to run on Windows NT 3.1.

=== Microsoft Internet Explorer 3 ===
Market share history snapshot
for February 2005
IE4: 0.07%
IE5: 6.17%
IE6: 82.79%

Microsoft Internet Explorer 3 was released on August 13, 1996, and went on to be much more popular than its predecessors. It was the first major browser with CSS support, although this support was only partial. It also introduced support for ActiveX controls, Java applets, inline multimedia, and the PICS system for content metadata. Version 3 also came bundled with Internet Mail and News, NetMeeting, and an early version of the Address Book, and was itself included with Windows 95 OSR2. Version 3 proved to be the first more popular version of Internet Explorer, bringing with it increased scrutiny. In the months following its release, a number of security and privacy vulnerabilities were found by researchers and hackers. This version of Internet Explorer was the first to have the 'blue e' logo. The Internet Explorer team consisted of roughly 100 people during the development of three months. The first major IE security hole, the Princeton Word Macro Virus Loophole, was discovered on August 22, 1996, in IE3.

Backwards compatibility was handled by allowing users who upgraded to IE3 to still use the previous version, because the installation renamed the old version (incorporating the old version number) and stored it in the same directory. It is the last version of Internet Explorer to run on Windows NT 3.5 and Windows NT 4.0 RTM through SP2.

=== Microsoft Internet Explorer 4 ===
Market share history snapshot
for October 2008
IE4: 0.01%
IE5: 0.20%
IE6: 37.01%
IE7: 35.81%

Microsoft Internet Explorer 4, released on September 22, 1997, deepened the level of integration between the web browser and the underlying operating system. Installing version 4 on Windows 95 or Windows NT 4.0 and choosing Desktop Update would result in the traditional File Explorer being replaced by a version more akin to a web browser interface, as well as the Windows desktop itself being web-enabled via Active Desktop. The integration with Windows, however, was subject to numerous packaging criticisms (see United States v. Microsoft). This option was no longer available with the installers for later versions of Internet Explorer, but was not removed from the system if already installed. It introduced support for Group Policy, allowing companies to configure and lock down many aspects of the browser's configuration as well as support for offline browsing. Internet Mail and News was replaced with Outlook Express, and Microsoft Chat and an improved NetMeeting were also included. This version was also included with Windows 95 OSR 2.5 and Windows 98. New features that allowed users to save and retrieve posts in comment forms were added, but they are not used today. Internet Explorer 4.5 offered new features such as easier 128-bit encryption. It also offered a dramatic stability improvement over prior versions, particularly the 68k version, which was especially prone to freezing.

=== Microsoft Internet Explorer 5 ===
Microsoft Internet Explorer 5, released on March 18, 1999, and subsequently included with Windows 98 SE and bundled with Office 2000 as an optional component and Office XP as a requirement prior to install, was another significant release that supported bi-directional text, ruby characters, XML, XSLT, and the ability to save web pages in MHTML format. IE5 was bundled with Outlook Express 5. Also, with the release of IE5, Microsoft released the first version of XMLHttpRequest, giving birth to Ajax (even though the term "Ajax" was not coined until years later). It was the last with a 16-bit version. Version 5.01, a bug fix version included in Windows 2000, was released in November 1999 and is the last version of Internet Explorer to run on Windows 3.1 and Windows NT 3.51. Internet Explorer 5.5 followed in June 2000, improving its print preview capabilities, CSS and HTML standards support, and developer APIs; this version was included with Windows ME. However, version 5 was the last version for Mac and UNIX. Version 5.5 was the last to have Compatibility Mode, which allowed Internet Explorer 4 to be run side by side with the 5.x series. The IE team consisted of over 1,000 people by 1999, with funding on the order of US$100 million per year. Version 5.5 is also the last version of Internet Explorer to run on Windows 95 and Windows NT 4.0 SP3 through SP6.

=== Microsoft Internet Explorer 6 ===
Microsoft Internet Explorer 6 was released on August 24, 2001, and subsequently included with Windows XP and Windows Server 2003. This version included DHTML enhancements, content restricted inline frames, and partial support of CSS level 1, DOM level 1, and SMIL version 2. The MSXML engine was also updated to version 3. Other new features included a new version of the Internet Explorer Administration Kit (IEAK), Media bar, Messenger integration, fault collection, automatic image resizing, P3P, and a new look-and-feel that was in line with the Luna visual style. Internet Explorer 6 SP1, which offered several security enhancements, was released on August 30, 2002 and it is the last version of Internet Explorer to run on Windows NT 4.0 SP6a, Windows 98, Windows 2000 and Windows Me, although it is only available as pre-installed in Windows XP RTM through SP1 and Windows Server 2003 RTM. In 2002, the Gopher protocol was disabled, and support for it was dropped in Internet Explorer 7. Internet Explorer 6 SV1 came out on August 6, 2004 for Windows XP SP2 and offered various security enhancements and new colour buttons on the user interface. Internet Explorer 6 updated the original 'blue e' logo to a lighter blue and more 3D look. Microsoft now considers IE6 to be an obsolete product and recommends that users upgrade to Internet Explorer 8. Some corporate IT users have not upgraded despite this, in part because some still use Windows 2000, which will not run Internet Explorer 7 or above. Microsoft has launched a website, https://web.archive.org/web/20110304205645/http://ie6countdown.com/, with the goal of getting Internet Explorer 6 usage to drop below 1 percent worldwide. Its usage is 6% globally as of October 2012, and now about 6.3% since June 2013, and depending on the country, the usage differs heavily: while the usage in Norway is 0.1%, it is 21.3% in the People's Republic of China. On January 3, 2012, Microsoft announced that usage of IE6 in the United States had dropped below 1%.

=== Windows Internet Explorer 7 ===
Windows Internet Explorer 7 was released on October 18, 2006, and subsequently included with Windows Vista and Windows Server 2008. It includes bug fixes, enhancements to its support for web standards, tabbed browsing with tab preview and management, a multiple-engine search box, a web feeds reader, Internationalized Domain Name support (IDN), Extended Validation Certificate support, and an anti-phishing filter. With IE7, Internet Explorer has been decoupled from the Windows Shell—unlike previous versions, the Internet Explorer ActiveX control is not hosted in the File Explorer process, but rather runs in a separate Internet Explorer process. It is the last version of Internet Explorer to run on Windows XP x64 Edition RTM and Windows Server 2003 SP1. The original release of Internet Explorer 7 required the computer to pass a Windows Genuine Advantage validation check prior to installing, but on October 5, 2007, Microsoft removed this requirement. As some statistics show, by mid-2008, Internet Explorer 7 market share exceeded that of Internet Explorer 6 in a number of regions.

=== Windows Internet Explorer 8 ===
Windows Internet Explorer 8 was released on March 19, 2009, and subsequently included with Windows 7 and Windows Server 2008 R2. It is the first version of IE to pass the Acid2 test, and the last of the major browsers to do so (in the later Acid3 Test, it only scores 24/100.). According to Microsoft, security, ease of use, and improvements in RSS, CSS, and Ajax support were its priorities for IE8.

It is the last version of Internet Explorer to run on Windows XP SP2+, Windows XP x64 Edition SP2, Windows Server 2003 SP2, Windows Vista RTM through SP1 and Windows Server 2008 RTM. Support for Internet Explorer 8 is bound to the lifecycle of the Windows version it is installed on as it is considered an OS component, thus it is unsupported on Windows XP due to the end of extended support for the latter in April 2014. Effective January 12, 2016, Internet Explorer 8 is no longer supported on any client or server version of Windows, due to new policies specifying that only the newest version of IE available for a supported version of Windows will be supported. However several Windows Embedded versions will remain supported until their respective EOL, unless otherwise specified.

=== Windows Internet Explorer 9 ===
Windows Internet Explorer 9 was released on March 14, 2011. Development for Internet Explorer 9 began shortly after the release of Internet Explorer 8. Microsoft first announced Internet Explorer 9 at PDC 2009, and spoke mainly about how it takes advantage of hardware acceleration in DirectX to improve the performance of web applications and quality of web typography. At MIX 10, Microsoft showed and publicly released the first Platform Preview for Internet Explorer 9, a frame for IE9's engine not containing any UI of the browser. Leading up to the release of the final browser, Microsoft released updated platform previews, each featuring improved JavaScript compiling (32-bit version), improved scores on the Acid3 test, as well as additional HTML5 standards support, approximately every six weeks. Ultimately, eight platform previews were released. The first public beta was released at a special event in San Francisco, which was themed around "the beauty of the web". The release candidate was released on February 10, 2011, and featured improved performance, refinements to the UI, and further standards support. The final version was released during the South by Southwest (SXSW) Interactive conference in Austin, Texas, on March 14, 2011.

It is the last version of Internet Explorer to run on Windows Vista SP2, Windows Server 2008 SP2, Windows 7 RTM and Windows Server 2008 R2 RTM, even Windows Phone 7.5. It supports several CSS 3 properties (including border-radius, box-shadow, etc.), and embedded ICC v2 or v4 colour profiles support via Windows Color System. The 32-bit version has faster JavaScript performance, this being due to a new JavaScript engine called "Chakra". It also features hardware accelerated graphics rendering using Direct2D, hardware-accelerated text rendering using DirectWrite, hardware-accelerated video rendering using Media Foundation, imaging support provided by Windows Imaging Component, and high fidelity printing powered by the XPS print pipeline. IE9 also supports the HTML video and audio tags and the Web Open Font Format. Internet Explorer 9 initially scored 95/100 on the Acid3 test, but has scored 100/100 since the test was updated in September 2011.

Internet Explorer was to be omitted from Windows in Europe, but Microsoft ultimately included it, with a browser option screen allowing users to select any of several web browsers (including Internet Explorer).

Internet Explorer is now available on Xbox 360 with Kinect support, as of October 2012, although this version is extremely limited today.

=== Internet Explorer 10 ===
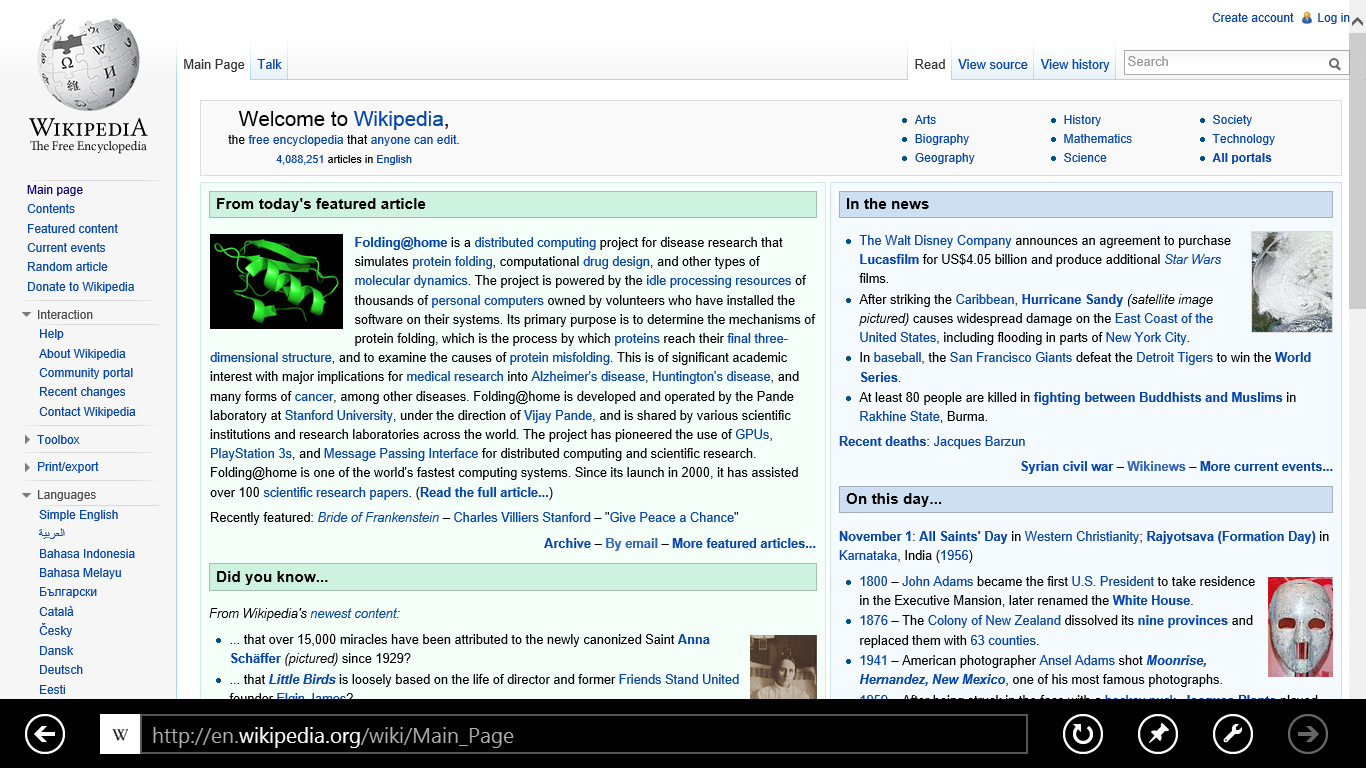
Internet Explorer 10 (app-style version) in Windows 8

Internet Explorer 10 was released on September 4, 2012, and subsequently included with Windows 8 and Windows Server 2012. It became available for Windows 7 and Windows Server 2008 R2 on February 26, 2013. Microsoft announced Internet Explorer 10 in April 2011, at MIX 11 in Las Vegas, releasing the first Platform Preview at the same time. At the show, it was said that Internet Explorer 10 was about three weeks in development. This release further improves upon standards support, including HTML5 Drag & Drop and CSS3 gradients. Internet Explorer 10 Release Preview was also released on the Windows 8 Release Preview platform.

=== Internet Explorer 11 ===
Internet Explorer 11 is featured in a Windows 8.1 and Windows Server 2012 R2 update which was released on October 17, 2013. It includes an incomplete mechanism for syncing tabs. It features a major update to its developer tools, enhanced scaling for high DPI screens, HTML5 prerender and prefetch, hardware-accelerated JPEG decoding, closed captioning, HTML5 full screen, and is the first Internet Explorer to support WebGL and Google's protocol SPDY (starting at v3). This version of IE has features dedicated to Windows 8.1, including cryptography (WebCrypto), adaptive bitrate streaming (Media Source Extensions) and Encrypted Media Extensions.

Internet Explorer 11 was made available for Windows 7 and Windows Server 2008 R2 users to download on November 7, 2013, with Automatic Updates in the following weeks.

Internet Explorer 11's user agent string now identifies the agent as "Trident" (the underlying browser engine) instead of "MSIE". It also announces compatibility with Gecko (the browser engine of Firefox).

Microsoft claimed that Internet Explorer 11, running the WebKit SunSpider JavaScript Benchmark, was the fastest browser as of October 15, 2013.

Since January 12, 2016, only the most recent version of Internet Explorer offered for installation on any given Windows operating system is supported with security updates, lasting until the end of the support lifecycle for that Windows operating system. On Windows 7 and 8.1, only Internet Explorer 11 received security updates until the end of those Windows versions' support lifecycles. Support for Internet Explorer 11 is bound to the lifecycle of the Windows version it is installed on as it is considered an OS component, thus it is unsupported on Windows 7 due to the end of extended support on January 14, 2020. Internet Explorer 11 was made available for Windows Server 2012 and Windows Embedded 8 Standard, the only still supported edition of Windows 8 in April 2019. It is the only supported version of Internet Explorer on these operating systems since January 31, 2020.

Internet Explorer 11 follows the OS component lifecycle, which means it remains supported with technical and security fixes as long as the operating system including it as a component remains supported. This means that Internet Explorer 11 support will end on January 13, 2032, along with the end of Windows 10 IoT Enterprise LTSC 2021 support, barring any changes to the support policy. On August 17, 2020, Microsoft published a timeline indicating that the Microsoft Teams product would stop supporting Internet Explorer 11 on November 30, 2020, and Microsoft 365 products ended support for Internet Explorer 11 on August 17, 2021. In May 2021, Microsoft announced that support for Internet Explorer 11 on editions of Windows 10 that are not in the Long-Term Servicing Channel (LTSC) would end on June 15, 2022. Internet Explorer 11 was thought to not be on Windows 11, Windows Server Insider Build 22463 and Windows Server Insider Build 25110 as a separate application - however, a few people managed to access it, through the question mark in the Internet Options window. However, while the browser itself is no longer supported, it is supported as IE mode in Edge, including on Windows 11, Windows Server Insider Build 22463 and Windows Server Insider Build 25110. Microsoft has said that it will maintain support for this feature until 2029 at the earliest, and that it will provide one year's notice before its discontinuation. IE mode uses the Trident MSHTML engine.

== Release history for desktop Windows OS version ==
Legend: Unsupported version (Note: Versions that have this color have reached their expiration dates and are no longer supported by Microsoft.) Old version, still maintained (Note: Versions that have this color are no longer the latest version of Windows 11, but are still supported by Microsoft.) Latest version (Note: Versions that have this color are the latest public version of Internet Explorer.)

Major version	Minor version	Release date	Significant changes	Shipped with
1	1.0	August 24, 1995	Initial release.	Plus! for Windows 95
1	1.5	September 1995	Support for HTML tables and other elements.	
2	2.0	November 22, 1995	SSL, cookies, VRML, and Internet newsgroups.; Last version for Windows NT 3.1.	Windows 95 OSR1; Windows NT 4.0
3	3.0	August 13, 1996	Improved support of HTML tables, frames, and other elements, support of VBScript and JScript, support of CSS and Java.; Final version for the MIPS and PowerPC architectures.; Last version for Windows NT 3.5.	Windows 95 OSR2
4	4.0	September 22, 1997	Improved support for HTML, CSS and Microsoft DOM.	Windows 95 OSR 2.5; Windows 98
5	5.0	March 18, 1999	Final 16-bit version.; Support for new CSS2 features, bi-directional text, ruby character, XML/XSLT and more CSS properties.; Final version for the DEC Alpha architecture.; Last version for Windows 3.1 and Windows NT 3.51.	Windows 98 SE; Windows 2000
5	5.5	June 19, 2000	Support for more CSS properties.; Minor changes to support for frames.; Last version for Windows 95.	Windows Me
5	5.6	August 18, 2000	Only released for a preview version of Windows Whistler.	Windows Whistler
6	6.0	August 24, 2001	More CSS changes and bug fixes to be more W3C-compliant.; First 64-bit version for the IA-64 and AMD64 architectures.; Last version for Windows NT 4.0, Windows 98, Windows 2000 and Windows Me.	Windows XP; Windows Server 2003
6	6.0 SP2	August 25, 2004	Vulnerability patch. Popup/ActiveX blocker. Add-on manager.	Windows XP SP2; Windows Server 2003 SP1
7	7.0	October 18, 2006	Support for PNG alpha channel, CSS bug fixes, and tabbed browsing.; Support for EV SSL certificate, Phishing filter, Web feeds platform integration, New GUI, Quick Tabs.	Windows Vista; Windows Server 2008
8	8.0	March 19, 2009	CSS 2.1, Contextual Services.; Accelerators.; Web Slices.; Tab isolation and DEP protection enabled by default.; Automatic crash recovery.; Improved phishing and malware filter (SmartScreen).; Uses 6 HTTP server connections for improved website responsiveness and InPrivate browsing.; Smart address bar.; Search suggestions.; Tab color grouping.; Caret browsing.; Improved Developer Tools.; Changes in Compatibility View.; Improved Favorites management and other minor changes to UI. Changes to InPrivate browsing and blocking modes.; Last version for Windows XP and Windows Server 2003.	Windows 7 Windows Server 2008 R2
9	9.0	March 14, 2011	Revamped UI with new download manager, new New Tab page, integrated search and address bar, and more.; Adds Tracking Protection, ActiveX Filter, and paste-to-navigate.; Support for new CSS3 selectors (including border-radius property), and new HTML5 and SVG elements, <audio>, <video> and <canvas> tags.; Support for WOFF fonts.; New JavaScript engine (code name Chakra) with ECMAScript5 support.; Added support for graphics and web rendering hardware acceleration, using Direct2D and DirectWrite.; Last version for Windows Vista and Windows Server 2008.	
10	10.0	September 4, 2012	Support for CSS3 multi-column layout, CSS3 grid layout, CSS3 flexible box layout, CSS3 gradients, ES5 strict mode, Positioned Floats, CSS stylesheet limit lifted, CSSOM Floating Point Value support, Improved hit testing APIs, Media Query Listeners, async attribute on script elements, Drag and Drop, File API, Sandbox, Web Workers, some Web Performance APIs, CSS 3D Transforms, CSS Text shadow, SVG Filter Effects, Spellchecking, Autocorrection, local storage with IndexedDB and the HTML5 Application Cache, Web Sockets, HTML5 History, and InPrivate tabs.	Windows 8 Windows Server 2012
11	11.0	October 17, 2013	Improved support for HTML5 and CSS3. Support for WebGL and SPDY. New Modern UI-interface and developer tools.; Last version for Windows 7, Windows Server 2008 R2 and Windows Server 2012.	Windows 8.1; Windows Server 2012 R2
11	11.0.7	April 8, 2014	Enterprise Mode, new Developer Tools, improved support for WebGL and ECMAScript 5.1.	Windows 8.1 Update
11	11.0.11	August 12, 2014	Improved support for WebGL, new features in Developer Tools, support for WebDriver, adds a search bar to the New Tab page.	
11	11.0.15	December 9, 2014	Revamped Developer Tool interface, opt-in to block SSL 3 fallback.	Windows 10
11	11.0.25	November 12, 2015	Improved Enterprise Mode and new support tools	Windows Server 2016; Windows Server 2019; Windows Server 2022

== See also ==
- Internet Explorer
- Features of Internet Explorer
- History of Internet Explorer
