= IE2 =

IE2 may refer to:

- Internet Explorer 2, a version of the web browser
- IE2, an IEC 60034-30 energy-efficiency class for electric motors
