= IE1 =

IE1 may refer to:

- Internet Explorer 1, the first version of the Internet Explorer web browser
- IE1, an IEC 60034-30 energy-efficiency class for electric motors
