= IE3 =

IE3 may refer to:

- Internet Explorer 3, a version of the graphical web browser
- IE3, an IEC 60034-30 energy-efficiency class for electric motors
