= IE4 =

IE4 may refer to:

- Internet Explorer 4, a version of the web browser
- IE4, an IEC 60034-30 energy-efficiency class for electric motors
