= IE5 =

IE5 may refer to:

- Internet Explorer 5, a version of the web browser
- IE5, an IEC 60034-30 energy-efficiency class for electric motors
