= Internet Explorer Administration Kit =

Microsoft Internet Explorer management program

Internet Explorer Administration Kit (IEAK), is a stand-alone freeware computer program from Microsoft that allows software developers, ISPs, content providers and large organizations to build, deploy and manage customized Internet Explorer installation packages for either distribution or internal use.

== Features ==
IEAK can be used by organizations to customize the settings for the browser, integrate add-ons, change branding of the browser to use customized logos, and centrally manage the distribution of the software. The IEAK consists of several components, including:

- Internet Explorer Customization Wizard, which lets an organization customize the configuration of the browser, and create redistributable packages with the customizations applied.
- IEAK Profile Manager, which lets create multiple sets of IE settings and customizations. Any of the set can then be quickly selected for building the redistributable.
- IEAK Toolkit, which provides tools, sample scripts and resources such as bitmaps (introduced in Internet Explorer 6).

== Versions ==
The first version of IEAK, version 3.0, was released in September 1996, ahead of the release of Internet Explorer 3 in 1997. It competed with Netscape's Mission Control software, which retailed for US$1,295 (equivalent to $2,537 in 2024); meanwhile, Microsoft offered IEAK free of charge. Since the release of IEAK 3.0, there has been a corresponding IEAK for every Internet Explorer release, culminating with the final version of Internet Explorer, version 11, in 2013. By the time of IEAK 4.0's release in late 1997, it was in use by over 2,000 licensed users.
