= Internet Explorer 7 =

Web browser for Windows

- Screenshot of Internet Explorer 7
- Developer: Microsoft
- Release: October 18, 2006; 20 years ago
- Stable release: Service Pack 2 (7.00.6002.18005) / May 26, 2009; 17 years ago
- Engine: MSHTML
- Operating system: Windows XP SP2 or later Windows XP x64 Edition or later Windows Server 2003 SP1 or later
- Platform: IA-32, x64 (and previously Itanium)
- Included with: Windows Vista, Windows Server 2008, Windows Embedded POSReady 2009, Windows Embedded Compact 7, Windows Embedded Compact 2013
- Predecessor: Internet Explorer 6 (2001)
- Successor: Internet Explorer 8 (2009)
- Type: Web browser Feed reader FTP client
- License: Proprietary, requires Windows license
- Website: Internet Explorer 7 (archived at Wayback Machine)

Windows Internet Explorer 7 (IE7) (codenamed Rincon) is a major version of the Internet Explorer web browser released by Microsoft on October 18, 2006. It was the first major update to the browser since 2001, and is the successor to Internet Explorer 6. It does not support versions of Windows earlier than Windows XP.

It is the last version of Internet Explorer to run on Windows XP x64 Edition RTM and Windows Server 2003 SP1. Some portions of the underlying architecture, including the rendering engine and security framework, have been improved. New features include tabbed browsing, page zooming, an integrated search box, a feed reader, better internationalization, and improved support for web standards, although it does not pass the Acid2 or Acid3 tests. Security enhancements include a phishing filter, 256-bit stronger encryption, and a "Delete browsing history" button to easily clear private data. It is also the first version of Internet Explorer which is branded and marketed under the name 'Windows', instead of 'Microsoft'.

Support for Internet Explorer 7 ended on October 10, 2023 alongside the end of support for Windows Embedded Compact 2013. Support for Internet Explorer 7 on other Windows versions ended on January 12, 2016 when Microsoft began requiring customers to use the latest version of Internet Explorer available for each Windows version.

== History ==
On February 15, 2005 at the RSA Conference in San Francisco, Microsoft Chairman Bill Gates announced that Microsoft was planning a new version of Internet Explorer. Both he and Dean Hachamovitch, General Manager of the Internet Explorer team, cited needed security improvements as the primary reason for the new version.

The first beta of IE7 was released on July 27, 2005 for technical testing, and a first public preview version of Internet Explorer 7 (Beta 2 preview: Pre-Beta 2 version) was released on January 31, 2006.

The final public version was released on October 18, 2006. On the same day, Yahoo! provided a post-beta version of Internet Explorer 7 bundled with Yahoo! Toolbar and other Yahoo!-specific customizations.

In late 2007 both Internet Explorer 6 and 7 received updates. Most PC manufacturers, however, have pre-installed Internet Explorer 7 (as well as 8) on new XP PC's, especially netbooks.

On October 8, 2007, Microsoft removed the Windows Genuine Advantage component of IE7, allowing it to be downloaded and installed by those without a genuine copy of Windows.

Within a year after IE7's release (end of 2006 to end of 2007) support calls to Microsoft had decreased 10-20%.

On December 16, 2008, a security flaw was found in Internet Explorer 7 which can be exploited so that crackers can steal users' passwords. The following day, a patch was issued to fix the flaw, estimated to have affected around 10,000 websites.

As of May 2012, estimates of IE7's global market share were 1.5-5%.

=== Release history ===
- On January 31, 2006, Microsoft released a public preview build (Beta 2 preview: Pre-Beta 2 version) of Internet Explorer 7 on their web site. It stated that more public preview builds (possibly Beta 2 in April) of Internet Explorer 7 will be released in first half of that year, and final version will be released in second half of that year. The pre beta build was refreshed on March 20, 2006 to build 7.0.5335.5. A real Beta 2 Build was released on April 24, 2006 to build 7.0.5346.5. In addition, at the MIX'06 conference, Bill Gates said that Microsoft is already working on the next two versions of IE after version 7.
- On June 29, 2006, Beta 3 of Internet Explorer 7 (7.0.5450.4) was released. It features minor UI cleanups, re-ordering of tabs by drag and drop, as well as noticeable performance improvements.
- On August 24, 2006, the Release Candidate 1 (RC1) of Internet Explorer 7 (7.0.5700.6) was released. This was the last pre-release version of IE7 before the final release.
- On September 28, 2006, 3Sharp, a privately held technical services firm, published the results of a study, commissioned by Microsoft, evaluating eight anti-phishing solutions in which Internet Explorer 7 (Beta 3) came out on top. The study evaluated the ability to block phish, to warn about phish, and to allow good sites.
- On October 18, 2006, the first finished version was released on microsoft.com, and was distributed as a high-priority update via Automatic Updates (AU) on November 1. AU notifies users when IE7 is ready to install and shows a welcome screen that presents key features and choices to "Install", "Don't Install", or "Ask Me Later".
- On November 8, 2006, a version of Internet Explorer 7 was released for Windows Vista only (7.0.6000.16386).
- On November 11, 2006, a version of Internet Explorer 7 was released for Windows XP only (7.0.5730.11IC).
- On October 5, 2007, the latest version for Windows XP and Windows Server 2003 (7.0.5730.13) was made available.
- On February 4, 2008, a version of Internet Explorer 7 was released for Windows Vista SP1 and Windows Server 2008 only (7.0.6001.18000).
- On May 26, 2009, the latest version for Windows Vista and Windows Server 2008 (7.0.6002.18005) was made available.

| Version | Release date | Significant changes | Shipped with |
|---|---|---|---|
| 7.0 Beta 1 | July 27, 2005 | Support of PNG alpha channel. CSS bug fixes. Tabbed browsing. | Windows Vista Beta 1 |
| 7.0 Beta 2 Preview | January 31, 2006 | More CSS fixes. RSS platform integration. New UI. Quick Tabs. | |
| 7.0 Beta 2 | April 24, 2006 | Feature complete. More CSS fixes. Application compatibility fixes. | |
| 7.0 Beta 3 | June 29, 2006 | Fixes most rendering issues for CSS. | |
| 7.0 RC 1 | August 24, 2006 | Improvements in performance, stability, security, application compatibility and final CSS adjustments. | |
| 7.0 | October 18, 2006 | Final release. | Windows Vista |
| 7.0 SP1 | February 4, 2008 | Vulnerability patch. | Windows Vista SP1; Windows Server 2008 |
| 7.0 SP2 | May 26, 2009 | Latest updates included with Vista SP2 and Server 2008 SP2. | Windows Vista SP2; Windows Server 2008 SP2 |

== Features ==
IE7 Nears its Peak Market Share in 2008
| Version | Share |
|---|---|
| 4 | 0.01% |
| 5 | 0.06% |
| 5.5 | 0.06% |
| 6 | 24.67% |
| 7 | 46.35% |
| 8 | 0.37% |
| All versions | 71.52% |
Internet Explorer versions: 1; 2; 3; 4; 5; 6; 7; 8; 9; 10; 11

Internet Explorer 7 introduces the Windows RSS Platform with which it is tightly integrated and can subscribe to RSS and Atom feeds, synchronize and update them on a schedule and display them with its built-in style sheet.

Version 7 is intended to defend users from phishing as well as deceptive or malicious software, and it also features full user control of ActiveX and better security framework, including not being integrated as much with Windows as previous versions, thereby increasing security. Unlike previous versions, the Internet Explorer ActiveX control is not hosted in the Windows Explorer process, but rather it runs in its own process. It also includes bug fixes, enhancements to its support for web standards, tabbed browsing with tab preview and management, a multiple-engine search box, a web feeds reader, Internationalized Domain Name support (IDN), and antiphishing filter. On October 5, 2007, Microsoft removed the 'genuine software' validation before install, which means that all versions of Windows, whether able to pass validation or not, are able to install the browser. The integrated search box supports OpenSearch.

Internet Explorer operates in a special "Protected Mode", that runs the browser in a security sandbox that has no WRITE access to the rest of the operating system or file system. When running in Protected Mode, IE7 is a low integrity process; it cannot gain write access to files and registry keys outside of the low-integrity portions of a user's profile. This feature aims to mitigate problems whereby newly discovered flaws in the browser (or in Add-Ons hosted inside it) allowed crackers to subversively install software on the user's computer (typically spyware).

=== Usability and accessibility ===
Quick Tabs

Favorites Center in Favorites view, Feeds view and History view

Browsing to a site which IE deems to be a phishing site is blocked by default. The user has to make an explicit choice before continuing.

- Version 7 tabs. The user can rearrange tabs by dragging and dropping them as desired.

=== Privacy and security ===
- Since it is tightly integrated with the operating system, Internet Explorer makes full use of the accessibility framework provided in Windows. Internet Explorer is also a user interface for FTP, with operations similar to that of Windows Explorer. However, with version 7, FTP sites are rendered in a hyper linked page, with the folder-like view available if the site is accessed from Windows Explorer. IE7 can itself launch Windows Explorer for FTP sites.
- Protected Mode, whereby the browser runs in a sandbox with even lower rights than a limited user account. As such, it can only write to the Temporary Internet Files folder and cannot install start-up programs or change any configuration of the operating system without communicating through a broker process. IE7 Protected Mode relies on the User Account Control technology.
- ActiveX Opt-In blocks ActiveX Control unless it allowed to be installed. This feature improves security from unverifiable and vulnerable controls. ActiveX controls can be chosen to be installed on Information Bar. User can turn on and off ActiveX Control by using Add-on Manager.
- The new Phishing Filter offers protection against phishing scams and other websites that may be considered dangerous for a user to enter their personal information into. When enabled, every website the user visits is checked against a master list of known phishing sites. If a site is listed, the user is informed. In light of the privacy implications of this feature, it is not enabled automatically; the user is asked when they start Internet Explorer 7 if they want it enabled. Microsoft is working in conjunction with companies that specialize in identifying phishing schemes to ensure the list of known sites is accurate and quickly updated.
- The address bar and status bar appear in all windows including popups which helps to block malicious sites from disguising them as trusted sites. Also the address bar features a color code to visually indicate the trustworthiness of the page. The address bar turns red when a page, with invalid security certificate, is accessed. In case of sites not using any encryption, the address bar is white. And if the page uses high security certificate, the bar turns green.
- Modal windows such as dialog boxes are shown only when the tab that has generated them is selected (in such situations, the tab color becomes orange). On the other hand, the save window is modal and when saving the page shown in a tab, the user cannot browse other tabs.
- The address bar no longer allows JavaScript to be executed on blank pages (about:blank). This feature is still supported on other pages though, which enables bookmarklets to work properly. A reason for the change has not been given.
- The status bar no longer allows custom text to be entered (e.g.: "Formatting C:\ 10% Complete |||||||") and will always show the URL of any link hovered over, for security. It now also shows the target URL of form buttons to help identify forms which submit their data to suspicious sites.
- The ability to limit scripting functions, such as those that modify the status bar or adjust the size or position of the browser window was introduced with IE7.
- "Delete Browsing History" cleans the complete browsing history in a single step. Previously this was a multistage process requiring users to delete browser cache, history, cookies, saved form data and passwords in a series of different steps. This is useful for improving privacy and security in a multiuser environment, such as an Internet café.
- Fix My Settings checks at startup or when a setting is changed, if the current settings are unsafe it notifies the user. The user can also press a button to fix the settings to a safe state. There is currently no way to disable these warnings.
- Old protocols and technologies removed: Gopher, TELNET, Scriptlets, DirectAnimation, Channels (.CDF files) also known as 'Active Desktop Items', etc. The DHTML Editing Control is being removed from IE7 to reduce surface area for security attacks.
- No Add-ons allows IE7 to launch without the installed extensions.
- IE7 cipher strength: 256-bit

Sites presenting EV Certificates are trusted

- The address bar turns red when the certificate presented by a secure site has some problems. In that case navigation to the site is blocked by default, and can only be accessed after the user explicitly confirms the navigation.
- IE7 includes support for Extended Validation Certificates (EV). When sites present an EV certificate the address bar is shown in green.
- New Group Policy's Administrative Templates (.adm files) for IE7 are loaded automatically onto the Domain Controller when a Group Policy is opened from a workstation where IE7 has been installed. These new administrative templates allow for controlling the Anti-Phishing filter state, for example.
- Reset Internet Explorer settings Deletes all temporary files, disables browser add-ons, and resets all the changed settings to factory settings. It can be used if the browser is in an unusable state.

Microsoft has addressed security issues in two distinct ways: User Account Control, which forces a user to confirm any action that could affect the stability or security of the system even when logged in as an administrator, and "Protected-mode IE", which runs the web browser process with much lower permissions than the user.

The first vulnerability exclusive to Internet Explorer 7 was posted after 6 days.

Internet Explorer 7 is a component of Windows Embedded Compact 7 and Windows Embedded Compact 2013 and follows the same lifecycle, thus it was supported until October 10, 2023.

==== Phishing filter ====
Some users have criticised the phishing filter for being too easy to circumvent. One successful method of bypassing Internet Explorer's Phishing Filter has been reported by redirecting a blacklisted web page to another, non-blacklisted page, using a server-side redirect. Until the new page is blocked as well, the attack can remain active.

This flaw means that phishers can keep links from previous emails functioning by simply moving to a new server when their original web page is blacklisted and adding a redirect.

This has been criticised as doubly serious as the presence of a phishing filter may lull users into a false sense of security when the filter can be bypassed.

Phishing filter went on to be developed into and renamed Safety Filter and then SmartScreen by Microsoft, during the development of Internet Explorer 8.

=== Standards support ===
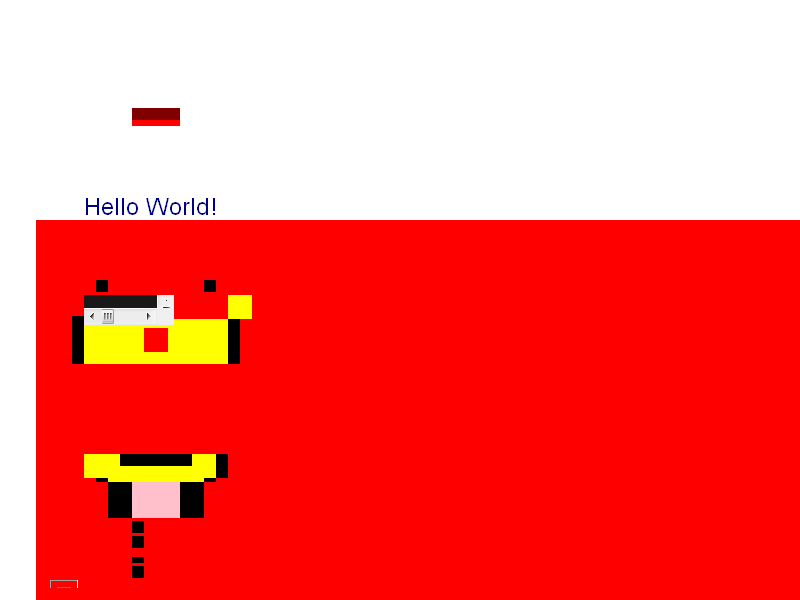
Acid2 output in Internet Explorer 7

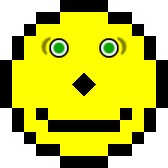
Acid2 reference output

Internet Explorer 7 adds support for per-pixel alpha transparency in PNG, as well as minor improvements to HTML, CSS and DOM support. Microsoft's stated goal with version 7 was to fix the most significant bugs and areas which caused the most trouble for developers, however full compatibility with standards was postponed.

Internet Explorer 7 additionally features an update to the WinInet API. The new version has better support for IPv6, and handles hexadecimal literals in the IPv6 address. It also includes better support for Gzip and deflate compression, so that communication with a web server can be compressed and thus will require less data to be transferred. Internet Explorer Protected Mode support in WinInet is also exclusive.

Although Internet Explorer 7 is more compliant than previous versions, according to all figures it remains the least standards-compliant compared to other major browsers of the period. It does not pass the Acid2 or the Acid3 tests, two test cases designed by the Web Standards Project to verify CSS compliance.

In a 2008 MSNBC article, Tim Berners-Lee said that lack of support in Internet Explorer was responsible for holding back the widespread adoption by webmasters of several new open technology standards, specifically scalable vector graphics (SVG), supported elsewhere since 2001, but only available in Internet Explorer using a 3rd party plugin (until the release of Internet Explorer 9).

== System requirements ==
IE7 requires at least:

- 233 MHz processor
- Windows XP SP2
- Windows Server 2003 SP1
- Super VGA (800 × 600) monitor with 256 colors
- Mouse or compatible pointing device
- RAM (for the browser alone): 64 MB for 32-bit, 128 MB for 64-bit

| Preceded by Internet Explorer 6 | Internet Explorer 7; 2006 | Succeeded by Internet Explorer 8 |
