= Spyglass, Inc. =

Former Internet software company

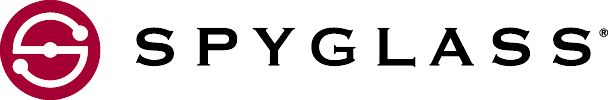
- Company type: Public
- Traded as: Nasdaq: SPYG
- Industry: Software
- Founded: 1990; 36 years ago
- Founder: NCSA, University of Illinois at Urbana–Champaign
- Defunct: 2000
- Fate: Acquired by OpenTV (now Kudelski Group)
- Headquarters: Naperville, Illinois, United States
- Products: Web browser intellectual property
- Website: spyglass.com at the Wayback Machine (archived 2000-06-21)

Spyglass, Inc. was an Internet software company. It was founded in 1990, in Champaign, Illinois, as an offshoot of the University of Illinois at Urbana–Champaign, and later moved to Naperville, Illinois. Spyglass was created to commercialize and support technologies from the National Center for Supercomputing Applications (NCSA). It focused on data visualization tools, such as graphing packages and 3D rendering engines.

Spyglass became well known for its version of the Mosaic web browser. The company was acquired by OpenTV in 2000, now part of Kudelski Group, in a $2.5 billion stock swap.

== Mosaic ==
In May 1994, Spyglass licensed NCSA's Mosaic browser for several million dollars, with the intent to develop their own Web browser. However, NCSA's development effort had resulted in different features, user interfaces, and codebases for each of its major platforms: UNIX, Microsoft Windows, and classic Mac OS. Spyglass therefore created its own Mosaic codebase in which most source code and all features were shared between platforms.

Spyglass offered a 30-day trial version for download, but did not actually sell the product to end-users. Instead, it licensed the code to re-sellers that delivered either an unmodified Spyglass Mosaic (e.g., O'Reilly and Associates) or a browser based on the Spyglass codebase (as CompuServe, IBM and Ipswitch) did. Among the browsers produced under license using Spyglass Mosaic's codebase was Microsoft's Internet Explorer.

In addition to the major desktop platforms, Spyglass ported Mosaic to other systems including Nintendo 64 for the SharkWire Online system.

=== Browser wars ===
Netscape Communications Corporation, co-founded by Marc Andreessen, released its flagship Netscape Navigator browser in October 1994, and the company soon became the web browser industry leader. Microsoft recognized the potential of the web, and after the company lost out to AOL for BookLink's browser in November 1994, Microsoft reached a licensing deal with Spyglass in January 1995. Spyglass' Mosaic code became the basis for Internet Explorer, which was released as an add-on to Windows 95 in the Microsoft Plus! software package.

Microsoft and Spyglass reached an updated agreement in 1997, following a dispute over Microsoft only paying the minimum amount required for each quarterly royalty. Internet Explorer 6 and older acknowledged Spyglass and NCSA Mosaic in the 'About' panel, but the message was removed starting with Internet Explorer 7 in 2006.

== Web server technology ==
Spyglass created and marketed a commercially supported web server for Unix and Windows NT, variously called Spyglass Server and Server SDK. The product was announced in March 1995 and became available in July 1995. Like the Netscape server that was already on the market, the Spyglass Server included an application programming interface that allowed server-side applications to run in the server's process. The two server platforms differed in their approach to security, with Spyglass using the Secure Hypertext Transfer Protocol (SHTTP), while Netscape used its own Secure Sockets Layer (SSL). Spyglass did not offer their server as a retail product, instead licensing it in volume to original equipment manufacturers, as it did with its browser. The largest licensee was Oracle Corporation.

== Acquisition ==
On March 26, 2000, OpenTV revealed plans to acquire Spyglass in a $2.5 billion stock swap. OpenTV said it planned to use Spyglass' Prism server software with its own interactive TV services, and OpenTV would continue the company's expansion in the mobile browser market. The deal was finalized later that year.

OpenTV, in turn, was fully acquired by the Kudelski Group on March 29, 2010.
