= Internet Explorer 2 =

Web browser for Windows released in 1995

- Screenshot of Internet Explorer 2
- Developer: Microsoft
- Release: November 27, 1995; 30 years ago
- Stable release: Windows: 2.01 / April 30, 1996; 30 years ago Mac OS: 2.1 / August 14, 1996; 30 years ago
- Operating system: Windows 3.1; Windows NT 3.1; Windows NT 3.5; Windows NT 3.51; Windows 95; System 7; Mac OS 8
- Platform: x86 (16- and 32-bit), 68k, PowerPC, MIPS, Alpha AXP
- Included with: Windows 95 OSR1; Windows NT 4.0
- Predecessor: Internet Explorer 1.0 (1995); Internet Explorer 1.5 (1996)
- Successor: Internet Explorer 3 (1996)
- Available in: 24 languages
- Type: Web browser
- License: Freeware
- Website: Internet Explorer 2 (archived at Wayback Machine)

Microsoft Internet Explorer 2 (IE2) is the second version of Internet Explorer (IE), a graphical web browser by Microsoft. It was unveiled in October 1995, and was released on November 27, 1995, for Microsoft Windows, and on April 23, 1996, for Apple Macintosh.

Version 2 launched with 12 languages, including English, but this would expand to 24, 20, and 9. It is the last version of Internet Explorer to run on Windows NT 3.1. It lacked many features that became common in later IE versions, including the blue 'e' logo, integration with Windows Explorer, and bundled programs. Its market share was also much lower than later versions. During its tenure, IE market share only went up to about roughly 3-9%.

Internet Explorer 2 is no longer supported, and is not available for download from Microsoft.

== History ==
IE replicated many of the quirks of Netscape Navigator, and allowed importing bookmarks from it. In May 1996, FTP Software announced it was providing Microsoft with various technology for Internet Explorer 2.0, including a PPP network, 16-bit email client, and other technology.

=== Availability ===
Internet Explorer version 2 was released in beta in October 1995, only 2 months after version 1 came out in Microsoft Plus! for ‘95 that August. It was released for Microsoft Windows in November 1995. The Beta for Mac on PowerPC came out in January, and the finalized version in April for 68k and PowerPC. The Mac version was not released until January 1996 for PPC, and April for 68k. Version 2 was included in Microsoft's Internet Starter Kit in early 1996. It launched with twelve languages, including English, but this expanded to 24, 20, and 9 for Win 95, Win 3.1 and Mac respectively by April 1996. The 2.0i version supported double-byte character-sets for supporting Chinese, Japanese or Korean characters in web pages. Version 2.1 for the Mac came out in August 1996, the same month version 2 for Windows was superseded by Internet Explorer 3. There were 16-bit and 32-bit versions depending on the OS.

=== Mac version ===
The Mac version, especially version 2.1, was praised for being economic with resources and for new features. Internet Explorer supported the embedding of a number of multimedia formats into web pages, including AVI and QuickTime formatted video and AIFF, MIDI and WAV formatted audio. The non-beta final version was released three months later on April 23, 1996. Version 2.1 fixed bugs and improving stability, but also added a few features such as support for the NPAPI (the first version of Internet Explorer on any platform to do so) and support for QuickTime VR. AOL 3.0 for Macintosh used the IE 2.1 rendering engine in its built-in web browser. The various 16 and 32 bit versions largely depended on the OS although NT-based systems would use the 16 bit versions.

Netscape has enjoyed a virtual monopoly of the browser market (about 90% according to some estimates), and this has allowed it to consolidate its position still further by introducing unofficial or 'extended' HTML tags. As a result, the Web is littered with pages that only work effectively if viewed in Navigator. By the time other browsers catch up, Netscape has made even more additions.

— Jack Weber, MacUser (1996)

== Features ==
IE2 introduced new or improved features for its time period. Many soon became ubiquitous (such as cookies) while others such as the integrated email client were removed in later versions due to being out of scope and better covered by dedicated software like Outlook. The features are:

- Secure Sockets Layer (SSL) protocol
- HTTP cookies
- Virtual Reality Modeling Language (VRML)
- Integrated email and news client
  - Support for SMTP and POP protocols
  - Support for newsgroups over NNTP protocol
  - Spelling checker
  - Automatic mail management (filter)
  - MIME
  - MAPI
- JavaScript (from Internet Explorer 2.5)
- HTML3
  - HTML tables
  - HTML Frames element support
  - Nonstandard tags, such as <bgsound>...</bgsound>
- RSA
- PPP network stack
- Bookmark importer for Netscape

== Versions ==
Windows versions
Version	Release date	Significant changes	Shipped with
2.0 Beta	October 1995	Support of HTML tables and other elements	
2.0	November 27, 1995	Final release. SSL, cookies, VRML, and Internet newsgroups.	Windows 95 OSR1; Windows NT 4.0; Internet Starter Kit
2.01	April 30, 1996	Bug fix release. Last version for Windows NT 3.1.	
2.1	August 14, 1996	Minor Update for Windows 3.1 and Windows NT 3.51.	

Mac versions
Version	Release date	Significant changes
2.0 Beta	January 23, 1996	Beta for PPC only
2.0	April 23, 1996	PPC and 68k Supported
2.1	August 14, 1996	Bug fixes; NPAPI support

Preceded by Internet Explorer 1	Internet Explorer 2; 1995	Succeeded by Internet Explorer 3
