= Windows NT 3.51 =

1995 Microsoft operating system version

- Version of the Windows NT operating system

- Developer: Microsoft
- Working state: No longer supported
- Source model: Closed source
- General availability: May 30, 1995; 31 years ago
- Final release: Service Pack 5 (3.51.1057.6) / September 19, 1996; 30 years ago
- Marketing target: Business and Server
- Supported platforms: IA-32, Alpha, (Note: DEC Alpha is supported in Windows NT 3.51 in 32-bit versions only, using a 32-bit application binary interface on an otherwise native 64-bit platform. No versions of Windows NT for the 64-bit Alpha (AXP64) platform were available to the public; they were only developed internally by Microsoft and mainly served as testing grounds for the 64-bit Itanium (IA-64) platform when no other Itanium hardware was available and was still in development.) MIPS, PowerPC
- Kernel type: Hybrid
- Userland: Windows API, NTVDM, OS/2 1.x, POSIX.1
- License: Commercial proprietary software
- Preceded by: Windows NT 3.5 (1994)
- Succeeded by: Windows NT 4.0 (1996)

Support status
- Server: Mainstream support ended on September 30, 2000. Extended support ended on September 30, 2002.
- Workstation: Mainstream support ended on December 31, 2000. Extended support ended on December 31, 2001.

Windows NT 3.51 is the third major release of the Windows NT operating system, developed by Microsoft for the data server and personal workstation markets. It was released on May 30, 1995, eight months following the release of Windows NT 3.5.

The most significant enhancement offered in this release was that it provides client/server support for inter-operating with Windows 95, which was released almost three months after NT 3.51. Both editions were succeeded by Windows NT 4.0 Workstation and Windows NT 4.0 Server, respectively, which was released a year later.

Mainstream support for Windows NT 3.51 Workstation ended on December 31, 2000, and extended support ended on December 31, 2001, while Windows NT 3.51 Server mainstream support ended on September 30, 2000, followed by extended support on September 30, 2002.

== Overview ==
The release of Windows NT 3.51 was dubbed "the PowerPC release" at Microsoft. The original intention was to release a PowerPC edition of NT 3.5, but according to Microsoft's David Thompson, "we basically sat around for 9 months fixing bugs while we waited for IBM to finish the Power PC hardware". Editions of NT 3.51 were also released for the x86, MIPS, and Alpha architectures.

New features introduced in Windows NT 3.51 include PCMCIA support, NTFS file compression, replaceable WinLogon (GINA), 3D support in OpenGL, persistent IP routes when using TCP/IP, automatic display of textual descriptions when the mouse pointer was placed on toolbar buttons ("tooltips") and support for Windows 95 common controls.

In view of the significant difference in the kernel base, Windows NT 3.51 is readily able to run a large number of Win32 applications designed for Windows 95. More recent 32-bit applications will not work, as the developers have prevented their application from working with any Windows version earlier than Windows 98, and also because some applications do not work properly with the older Windows NT 3.51 interface.

Despite this, Microsoft in their application releases muddied the issue, releasing 32-bit versions of Microsoft Office right up to Office 97 (the last version of Microsoft Office supported on NT 3.51), but relying upon 16-bit versions of Internet Explorer technology from versions 3.0 to 5.0. Web browsers based on and including Firefox were operable up to version 2.0.0.22, released in April 2009; they required a few manual file updates to work without compromising browsing security.

Windows NT 3.51 is the last of the series to be compatible with the Intel 80386 processor.

=== NewShell ===
On May 26, 1995, Microsoft released a test version of a shell refresh, named the Shell Technology Preview, and often referred to informally as "NewShell". This was the first incarnation of the modern Windows GUI with the Taskbar and Start menu. It was designed to replace the Windows 3.x Program Manager/File Manager based shell with Windows Explorer-based graphical user interface. The release provided capabilities quite similar to that of the Windows "Chicago" (codename for Windows 95) shell during its late beta phases; however, it was intended to be nothing more than a test release. There was a second public release of the Shell Technology Preview, called Shell Technology Preview Update made available to MSDN and CompuServe users on August 8, 1995. Both releases held Windows Explorer builds of 3.51.1053.1. The preview program provided early feedback for the Shell Update Release, the next major Windows NT version with the new interface built-in, which was released in July 1996 as Windows NT 4.0.

=== Updates ===
Five Service Packs were released for NT 3.51, introducing both bug fixes and new features. Service Pack 5, for example, fixed issues related to the Year 2000 problem.

== Hardware requirements ==
Windows NT 3.51 hardware requirements for the x86 version
Category	Minimum requirement
Processor	Intel 386 or 486 at 25 MHz
Memory	Workstation edition: 12 MB; Server edition: 16 MB
Video card	VGA
Hard disk drive standard	IDE, EIDE, SCSI or ESDI
Free hard disk drive space	90 MB
Installation media	CD-ROM drive, 1.44 MB or 1.2 MB floppy disk drive or active network connection

Supported EIDE addressing schemes include logical block addressing (LBA), ONTrack Disk Manager, EZDrive, and extended cylinder-head-sector (ECHS).
