= Internet Explorer 3 =

Web browser for Windows released in 1996

- Screenshot of Internet Explorer 3
- Developer: Microsoft
- Release: Windows: August 13, 1996; 30 years ago; Mac OS: January 8, 1997; 29 years ago
- Stable release: 3.03 SP1 (3.03.3006) / August 1998; 28 years ago
- Operating system: Windows 3.1; Windows NT 3.5; Windows NT 3.51; Windows 95; Windows NT 4.0; System 7; Mac OS 8
- Platform: x86, 68k, PPC, MIPS, Alpha AXP
- Included with: Windows 95 OSR2
- Predecessor: Internet Explorer 2 (1995)
- Successor: Internet Explorer 4 (1997)
- Type: Web browser
- License: Proprietary
- Website: Internet Explorer 3 (archived at Wayback Machine)

Microsoft Internet Explorer 3 (IE3) is the third version of the Internet Explorer graphical web browser which was announced in March 1996, and was released on August 13, 1996 by Microsoft for Microsoft Windows and on January 8, 1997 for Apple Mac OS (see IE for Mac). It began serious competition against Netscape Navigator in the first browser war. It was Microsoft's first browser release with a major internal development component. It was the first more widely used version of Internet Explorer, although it did not surpass Netscape or become the browser with the most market share. During its tenure, IE market share went from roughly 3–9% in early 1996 to 20–30% by the end of 1997. In September 1997 it was superseded by Internet Explorer 4.

IE3 was the first commercial browser with Cascading Style Sheets support. It introduced support for ActiveX controls, Java applets, inline multimedia, and the Platform for Internet Content Selection (PICS) system for content metadata. This version was the first version of Internet Explorer to use the blue 'e' logo, which later became a symbol of the browser. Version 3 came bundled with Internet Mail and News, NetMeeting, and an early version of the Windows Address Book. There were 16-bit and 32-bit versions depending on the OS.

This is the first version of Internet Explorer developed without Spyglass source code, but still used Spyglass technology, so the Spyglass licensing information remained in the program's documentation. In 1996 Microsoft said of its new browser "Internet Explorer 3 adds many new features which are great for HTML authors and demonstrates our accelerating commitment to W3C HTML standards."

It is the last version of Internet Explorer to run on Windows NT 3.5 and Windows NT 4.0 RTM through SP2, even for RISC (the 16-bit version can still be run through NTVDM.).

Internet Explorer 3 is no longer supported, and is not available for download from Microsoft.

== Overview ==
Internet Explorer 3.0 was released free of charge on the August 13, 1996. Microsoft thus made no direct revenues on IE and was liable to pay Spyglass only the minimum quarterly fee. In 1997, Spyglass threatened Microsoft with a contractual audit, in response to which Microsoft settled for $8 million U.S. Version 3 included Internet Mail and News 1.0 and the Windows Address Book. It brought the browser much closer to the bar that had been set by Netscape, including the support of Netscape's plugins technology (NPAPI), ActiveX, frames, and a reverse-engineered version of JavaScript named JScript. Later, Microsoft NetMeeting and Windows Media Player were integrated into the product and thus helper applications became not as necessary as they once were. CSS were introduced with version 3 of Internet Explorer. While IE1 and IE2 were said to have "paled" in comparison to Netscape, IE3 "delivers a crushing blow to Netscape". The user interface notably changes, with much larger buttons, with more intricate icons, and with a light gray design behind it. Unlike later IE versions, users who upgraded to IE3 could still use the last IE by converting the previous version to a separate directory. It could import favorites into IE3 from IE1 or 2. The competition between Netscape and Microsoft heated up, with some saying the Internet community "became polarized on the issue of which web browser had the most features." Other new features included ActiveMovie multimedia API, HTML Layout Control, Quick Links toolbar, VRML.

Microsoft announced on July 29, 1996 that it would develop a native version of IE for "Solaris and other popular variants of UNIX" to be available "by the end of 1996" which would have "equivalent functionality as that provided in Internet Explorer 3", thus "delivering on its commitment to provide full-featured Web browser support on all major operating system platforms" as well as "supporting and promoting open standards, including HTML, ActiveX and Java". In March, 1997 following a dispute which "arose between Microsoft and Bristol concerning each other's performance of the 1996 IE Agreement" and likely because of contract negotiations with Bristol to access Windows source code after September 1997 failing, Microsoft reversed course and decided to directly port the Windows version in-house using the MainWin XDE (eXtended Development Environment) application from Mainsoft, the main competitor to Bristol Technology. (Microsoft would later use MainWin to port Windows Media Player and Outlook Express to Unix.) Now well behind schedule, the 3.0 branch was apparently scrapped in favor of 4.0 (that was released for Windows half a year earlier), which used the new MSHTML (Trident) rendering engine. An Internet Explorer 4 Beta for Solaris was released by the end of 1997, leading to Internet Explorer for UNIX versions, which lasted until Internet Explorer 5.

Backwards compatibility was handled by allowing Users who upgraded to IE3 to still use the last IE, because the installation converted the previous version to a separate directory.

=== Security ===
The Princeton Word Macro Virus Loophole was discovered on August 22, 1996, nine days after Internet Explorer 3's release, which could allow Webmasters to cause an end-user's computer to initiate downloads without their consent via a backdoor. Microsoft patched the vulnerability the following day; however, researchers went on to find more vulnerabilities and new types of problems, such as the ability to spoof a website (similar to the later phishing problem), with these issues triggering public concern over browser security. In early 1997, Microsoft released IE 3.02 as an update to fix most of the discovered security problems.

Microsoft Authenticode became inoperable on June 30, 1997, when its trust anchor expired. After this, IE users needed to upgrade to Authenticode 2.0 which required at least IE 3.02. Authenticode is a code signing technology.

=== Internet Explorer version 3.0 for Macintosh ===
Internet Explorer 3 for Macintosh was released on January 8, 1997 for PPC, and added support for the SSL and NTLM security protocols and the PICS and RSACi rating systems that can be used to control access to websites based on content ratings. On November 5, 1996 Microsoft announced the release of a beta version for Mac of Internet Explorer version 3.0. This release added support for HTML version 3.2, CSS, Java applets and ActiveX controls. Keith Mitchell of Macworld noted in November 1996, when discussing the IE mac version, "With the near-simultaneous release of Netscape Navigator 3.0 (415/528-2555, http://www.netscape.com) and Internet Explorer 3 (206/882-8080, http://www.microsoft.com), both companies are tripping over each other to entice Web users to their products." A problem with an operating system extension used in the Mac OS called CFM68K Runtime Enabler, led to a delay in the release of the version 3.0 for Macs based on the 68k line of processors. Four months later on May 14, Microsoft released version 3.01 which included a version for 68k-based machines. This version included features from the Windows version of Internet Explorer 4.0 such as AutoComplete and Monitoring Favorites that notified users when sites in their Favorites list have been updated. It included support for JavaScript and introduced a Download Manager and a Cookie Manager. The download manager was introduced in version 3.01; version 3.0 would open the download progress bar in the main browser window, forcing the user to either cancel the download and restart it in a new window, or wait for the transfer to complete. MacUser's review noted "While Netscape Navigator 3.0 is more feature-laden and consequently bigger and slower than previous incarnations, Internet Explorer has been refined and optimised into a Web browser that has almost as many features, but is both smaller and faster than its rival."

== Bundled software ==
IE3 launched with a variety of integrated apps. The following is a list of those apps and a brief description for each.

- Internet Mail and News is an e-mail and news client included with IE3. It was replaced with Outlook Express 4.0 in IE4.
- Windows Address Book is an address book app that maintains a database of contacts that can be shared by multiple programs. It can query LDAP servers and read or write data to a local .wab file.
- Microsoft Comic Chat (not to be confused with the later Microsoft Chat) is a text-based online chat app that used cartoon avatars to display text and emotion. It was updated and renamed Microsoft Chat 2.0 in IE4.
- RealPlayer is a streaming media player made by Progressive Networks (later called RealNetworks). The first version of RealPlayer was introduced in April 1995 as RealAudio Player and is one of the first media players capable of streaming media over the Internet.

Later versions of Internet Explorer 3 included the following:

- Microsoft NetMeeting is a VoIP and multi-point videoconferencing client that uses the H.323 protocol for video and audio conferencing.
- Windows Media Player a media player that supports mainstream audio and video formats. The browser could play MIDI files on its own.

IE3 also included Microsoft Java Virtual Machine, which continued to be included until IE5.5. Because of a legal battle between Sun Microsystems (the developer of Java), Microsoft stopped offering it in 2001, although it was supported for several years after this (until the end of 2007).

== Platform ==
Major Microsoft OS releases, switched to supporting version 4 or higher. Internet Explorer 3 had a Beta supporting Solaris (UNIX). IE4 integration with the OS meant systems that upgraded from Internet Explorer 3 to 4.0, or came with 4.0, could not easily revert to IE3 (see Removal of Internet Explorer). The Mac OS version supported PPC and 68k Macs, superseding IE 2.1. Microsoft released various 16- and 32-bit versions for Windows.

Internet Explorer 3.03, and subsequently 3.03 Service Pack 1, were released after the launch of IE4.

== Encryption ==
Internet Explorer 3 was the first version of the browser to support SSL 3.0. The last patch versions of Internet Explorer 3 supported 40-bit and 128-bit encryption, using Server Gated Cryptography (SGC). 256-bit encryption would not become available in IE for nearly 10 years.

128-bit encryption was available or included for these versions:

- Internet Explorer 3.03 SP1
- Internet Explorer 3.02
- Internet Explorer 3.0 for Macintosh

If it was not possible to upgrade to 128-bit, then 40-bit (SGC) was standard.

== Version history ==
32-bit Internet Explorer 3 version numbers are in the form of 4.70.####, where # represents a varying digit.

Release history of Internet Explorer 3
Version name	Version number	Release date	Shipped with	Significant changes
3.0 Alpha 1	?	March 1996		Improved support of HTML tables, frames, and other elements.
3.0 Beta 1	?	May 29, 1996		VBScript and JScript support
3.0 Beta 2	?	July 17, 1996		CSS and Java support
3.0	4.70.1155	August 13, 1996		Final release.
3.0	4.70.1158	August 24, 1996	Windows 95 OSR2	
3.0	3.0.0.1152	November 1996		
3.0a	?	January 22, 1997		
3.01	4.70.1215	October 30, 1996		Bug fix release
3.01	3.01.	February 1997		
3.02	4.70.1300	March 25, 1997		Bug and security fix release.
3.02a	3.02a.2916	May 1997		
3.03	3.03.2925	August 1997		Bug fix release
3.03 SP1	3.03.3006	August 1998		Year 2000 compliance updates. Last version for Windows NT 3.5, even on the MIPS and PowerPC architectures.

Preceded by Internet Explorer 2	Internet Explorer 3; 1996	Succeeded by Internet Explorer 4
