= Windows NT 3.5 =

1994 Microsoft operating system version

- Version of the Windows NT operating system

- Screenshot of Windows NT 3.5
- Developer: Microsoft
- Working state: No longer supported
- Source model: Closed source
- Released to manufacturing: September 21, 1994; 32 years ago
- Final release: Service Pack 3 (3.5.807) / June 21, 1995; 31 years ago
- Marketing target: Business and Server
- Supported platforms: IA-32, Alpha, (Note: DEC Alpha is supported in Windows NT 3.5 in 32-bit versions only, using a 32-bit application binary interface on an otherwise native 64-bit platform. No versions of Windows NT for the 64-bit Alpha (AXP64) platform were available to the public; they were only developed internally by Microsoft and mainly served as testing grounds for the 64-bit Itanium (IA-64) platform when no other Itanium hardware was available and was still in development.) MIPS, PowerPC
- Kernel type: Hybrid
- Userland: Windows API, NTVDM, OS/2 1.x, POSIX.1
- License: Commercial proprietary software
- Preceded by: Windows NT 3.1 (1993)
- Succeeded by: Windows NT 3.51 (1995)

Support status
- Unsupported as of December 31, 2001.

Windows NT 3.5 is the second major release of the Windows NT operating system developed by Microsoft, targeting the data server and personal workstation markets. It was released on September 21, 1994, as the successor to Windows NT 3.1.

One of the primary goals during its development was to improve the operating system's performance. This is reflected in the product's codename, "Daytona", named after the Daytona International Speedway in Daytona Beach, Florida. Windows NT 3.5 was succeeded by Windows NT 3.51, released in 1995. Support and updates for Windows NT 3.5 was ended by Microsoft on December 31, 2001.

The source code for Windows NT 3.5 (as well as the original Xbox (based on a heavily-modified version of Windows 2000's kernel)) were leaked in 2020.

== Features ==
Windows NT 3.5 includes integrated Winsock and proper TCP/IP support, replacing the incomplete implementation of TCP/IP based on the AT&T UNIX System V "STREAMS" API found in Windows NT 3.1. TCP/IP and IPX/SPX stacks in Windows NT 3.5 are rewritten. NetBIOS over TCP/IP (NetBT) support as a compatibility layer for TCP/IP was introduced as also the Microsoft DHCP and WINS clients and DHCP and WINS servers.

Windows NT 3.5 can share files via the File Transfer Protocol, and printers through the Line Printer Daemon protocol. It can act as a Gopher, HTTP, or WAIS server, and includes Remote Access Service for remote dial-up modem access to LAN services using either SLIP or PPP protocols. The Resource Kit includes the first implementation of Microsoft DNS.

Other new features in Windows NT 3.5 include support for the VFAT file system, allowing for long file names in FAT16 partitions, Object Linking and Embedding (OLE) version 2.0 and support for input/output completion ports. Microsoft updated the graphical user interface to be more consistent with that of Windows for Workgroups 3.11. NT 3.5 shows performance improvements over NT 3.1, and requires less memory.

Windows NT 3.5 added support for ATAPI CD-ROMs. It allegedly also includes support for ISA PnP, but it is not enabled by default.

=== Editions ===
Windows NT 3.5 comes in two editions: NT Workstation and NT Server. They respectively replace the NT and NT Advanced Server editions of Windows NT 3.1. The Workstation edition allows only 10 concurrent clients to access the file server and does not support Mac clients.

== Limitations ==
A lack of drivers for PCMCIA cards limited NT 3.5's suitability for notebook computers. To install Windows NT 3.5 on a computer that has a sixth-generation or later x86 processor, one has to modify files on the installation files.

== Reception ==
In July 1995, Windows NT 3.5 with Service Pack 3 was rated by the National Security Agency as complying with Trusted Computer System Evaluation Criteria (TCSEC) C2 criteria.
