= IEC 60034 =

IEC standard

IEC 60034 is an international standard of the International Electrotechnical Commission for rotating electrical machinery.

== Part 30 ==
IEC 60034-30 specifies energy-efficiency classes for single-speed, continuous duty(S1), three-phase, cage-induction motors with 2, 4 or 6 poles. It classifies five classes: IE1 (standard), IE2 (high) and IE3 (premium), IE4 (super premium efficiency), IE5 (ultra premium efficiency). For each class the efficiency is defined for a rated output range from 0.75 to 375 kW. In the European Community the IE2 class is mandatory for all new motors since 16 June 2011. The IE3 class will be mandatory from 1 January 2015 (7.5–375 kW) and 1 January 2017 (0.75–375 kW).

From June 1, 2021, three-phase motors from 0.75 kW to 1000 kW must meet at least IE3 efficiency. Electric motors from 0.12 kW to 0.55 kW must meet at least class IE2 efficiency.

From July 1, 2023, at least efficiency class IE4 will be required for electric motors in 2/4/6-pole versions from 75 kW to 200 kW. At least IE2 efficiency will be required also for single-phase motors from 0.12 kW up.
