= Microsoft litigation =

Legal action against Microsoft

Microsoft has been involved in numerous high-profile legal matters that involved litigation over the history of the company, including cases against the United States, the European Union, and competitors.

== Governmental ==
In its 2008 annual report, Microsoft stated:

Government regulatory actions and court decisions may hinder our ability to provide the benefits of our software to consumers and businesses, thereby reducing the attractiveness of our products and the revenues that come from them. New actions could be initiated at any time, either by these or other governments or private claimants, including with respect to new versions of Windows or other Microsoft products. The outcome of such actions, or steps taken to avoid them, could adversely affect us in a variety of ways, including:

- We may have to choose between withdrawing products from certain geographies to avoid fines or designing and developing alternative versions of those products to comply with government rulings, which may entail removing functionality that customers want or on which developers rely
- The rulings described above may be cited as a precedent in other competition law proceedings.

=== Antitrust ===
In the 1990s, Microsoft adopted exclusionary licensing under which PC manufacturers were required to pay for an MS-DOS license even when the system was shipped with an alternative operating system. Critics attest that it also used predatory tactics to price its competitors out of the market and that Microsoft erected technical barriers to make it appear that competing products did not work on its operating system. In a consent decree filed on July 15, 1994, Microsoft agreed to a deal under which, among other things, the company would not make the sale of its operating systems conditional on the purchase of any other Microsoft product. On February 14, 1995, Judge Stanley Sporkin issued a 45-page opinion that the consent decree was not in the public interest. Later that spring, a three-judge federal appeals panel removed Sporkin and reassigned the consent decree. Judge Thomas Penfield Jackson entered the decree on August 21, 1995, three days before the launch of Windows 95.

A Microsoft purchase of Intuit was scuttled in 1994 due to antitrust concerns that Microsoft would be purchasing a major competitor.

After bundling the Internet Explorer web browser into its Windows operating system in the late 1990s (without requiring a separate purchase) and acquiring a dominant share in the web browser market, the antitrust case United States v. Microsoft was brought against the company. In a series of rulings by judge Thomas Penfield Jackson, the company was found to have violated its earlier consent decree and abused its monopoly in the desktop operating systems market. The "findings of fact" during the antitrust case established that Microsoft has a monopoly in the PC desktop operating systems market:

Viewed together, three main facts indicate that Microsoft enjoys monopoly power. First, Microsoft's share of the market for Intel-compatible PC operating systems is extremely large and stable. Second, Microsoft's dominant market share is protected by a high barrier to entry. Third, and largely as a result of that barrier, Microsoft's customers lack a commercially viable alternative to Windows. (III.34)

The findings of fact go on to explain the nature of the "barrier to entry":

The fact that there is a multitude of people using Windows makes the product more attractive to consumers. The large installed base ... impels ISVs (independent software vendors) to write applications first and foremost to Windows, thereby ensuring a large body of applications from which consumers can choose. The large body of applications thus reinforces demand for Windows, augmenting Microsoft's dominant position and thereby perpetuating ISV incentives to write applications principally for Windows ... The small or non-existent market share of an aspiring competitor makes it prohibitively expensive for the aspirant to develop its PC operating system into an acceptable substitute for Windows. (III.39–40)

The proposed remedy (dividing Microsoft into two companies) was never applied. The judge who decided the original case was removed from the decision concerning the penalty due to public statements, and replaced by a judge more sympathetic to Microsoft. While new penalties were under consideration, the Clinton administration ended and the Bush administration took office. The new administration announced that in the interest of ending the case as quickly as possible, it would no longer seek to break the company up, and that it would stop investigating claims of illegal tying of products. Eighteen days later, Judge Kollar-Kotelly ordered the justice department and Microsoft to "engage in discussions seven days a week, 24 hours a day." The judge cited the events of September 11, 2001, in her direction to begin settlement talks but did not explain the linkage between the two. Attorney General Ashcroft, however, denied that the events of September 11 had any effect on the outcome. Microsoft subsequently reached a settlement with the Department of Justice and some of the states which brought suit against it. Several class-action lawsuits filed after the conviction are still pending.

In early 2002, Microsoft proposed to settle the private lawsuits by donating $1 billion (~$1.71 billion in 2025) USD in money, software, services, and training, including Windows licenses and refurbished PCs, to about 12,500 underprivileged public schools. This was seen by the judge as a potential windfall for Microsoft, not only in educating schoolchildren on Microsoft solutions but also in flooding the market with Microsoft products. Among the protesters were Apple Inc. which feared further loss of its educational market share. The federal judge rejected the proposed settlement.

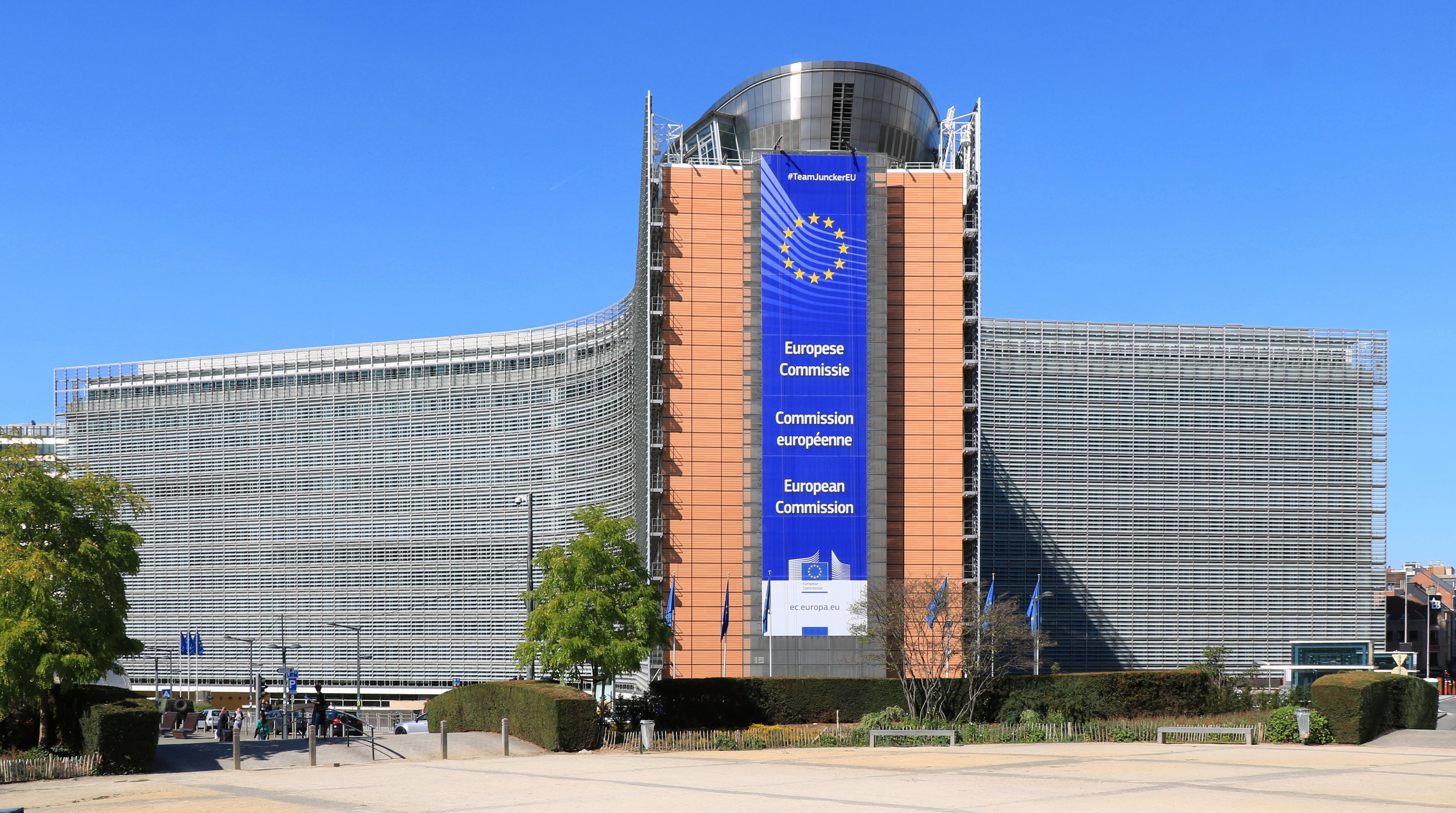
Headquarters of the European Commission, which has imposed several fines on Microsoft

In 2003 to 2004, the European Commission investigated the bundling of Windows Media Player into Windows, a practice which rivals complained was destroying the market for their own products. Negotiations between Microsoft and the Commission broke down in March 2004, and the company was subsequently handed down a record fine of €497 million ($666 million) for its breaches of EU competition law. Separate investigations into alleged abuses of the server market were also ongoing at the same time. On December 22, 2004, the European Court decided that the measures imposed on Microsoft by the European Commission would not be delayed, as was requested by Microsoft while waiting for the appeal. Microsoft has since paid a €497 million fine, shipped versions of Windows without Windows Media Player, and licensed many of the protocols used in its products to developers in countries within the European Economic Area. However, the European Commission has characterized the much delayed protocol licensing as unreasonable, called Microsoft "non-compliant" and still violating antitrust law in 2007, and said that its RAND terms were above market prices; in addition, they said software patents covering the code "lack significant innovation", which Microsoft and the EC had agreed would determine licensing fees. Microsoft responded by saying, that other government agencies had found "considerable innovation". Microsoft appealed the facts and ruling to the European Court of First Instance with hearings in September 2006.

In 2000, a group of customers and business filed a class action suit in Comes v. Microsoft Corp., alleging that Microsoft violated Iowa's antitrust laws by engaging in monopolistic practices. In 2002, the Iowa Supreme Court ruled that indirect purchasers (consumers who purchased computers from a third-party, with Microsoft's software pre-installed in the computer) could be included as members of the class in the class action suit. On remand, the trial court certified two classes of plaintiffs, and the Iowa Supreme Court ultimately affirmed the class certification. In August 2007, the parties ultimately reached a settlement valued at $179.95 million.

On September 17, 2007, the EU Court of First Instance rejected Microsoft's appeal.

The court affirmed the original contested finding:

21 In the contested decision, the Commission finds that Microsoft infringed Article 82 EC and Article 54 of the Agreement on the European Economic Area (EEA) by twice abusing a dominant position. 22 The Commission first identifies three separate worldwide product markets and considers that Microsoft had a dominant position on two of them. It then finds that Microsoft had engaged in two kinds of abusive conduct. As a result it imposes a fine and a number of remedies on Microsoft.

All elements of Microsoft's appeal were dismissed.

Microsoft accepted the judgment of the Court of First Instance and proceeded to make available interoperability information as originally required by the European Commission.

Microsoft also faced competition law in South Korea and was fined $32 million (~$50.6 million in 2025) in December 2005 and ordered to unbundle instant messaging, Windows Media Player and Windows Media Service, or let competitors' products take their place. Microsoft noted in their October 2005 SEC filing that they may have to pull out of South Korea, although they later denied fulfilling such a plan. Microsoft's 2006 appeal was struck down; they have another appeal pending. Microsoft also faced sanctions from Japan Fair Trade Commission twice in 1998 when Japanese manufacturers were forced to include Microsoft Word on new systems instead of homegrown word processor software Ichitaro, and again in 2004 for clauses detrimental to ability of Japanese computer manufacturers to obtain a Windows OEM license. A further raid followed in 2026 on similar charges regarding cloud computing services.

European antitrust regulators on February 27, 2008, fined Microsoft $1.3 billion for failing to comply with a 2004 judgment, that the company had abused its market dominance. The new fine by the European Commission was the largest it has ever imposed on an individual company, and brings the total in fines imposed on Microsoft to around $US 2.5 billion, with current exchange rates.

Microsoft had previously been fined after the commission determined in 2004 that the company had abused the dominance of its Windows operating system to gain unfair market advantage. The commission imposing the new fine said, that it was because the company had not met the prescribed remedies after the earlier judgment.

In July 2020, Slack filed an antitrust complaint with the European Commission against Microsoft, alleging that Microsoft broke EU competition rules by tying its Microsoft Teams software to its Microsoft 365 and Office 365 software suites. In July 2023, the European Commission formally opened an investigation into the alleged antitrust violation, and in June 2024 the European Commission announced its preliminary view that Microsoft had violated antitrust law, finding that "Microsoft may have granted Teams a distribution advantage by not giving customers the choice whether or not to acquire access to Teams" when purchasing its other software suites, and that "This advantage may have been further exacerbated by interoperability limitations between Teams' competitors and Microsoft's offerings." If the European Commission confirms its preliminary view, Microsoft potentially faces a fine of up to 10% of its annual worldwide revenue.

==== European Union ====
The European Union Microsoft competition case is a case brought by the European Commission of the European Union (EU) against Microsoft for abuse of its dominant position in the market (according to competition law). It started as a complaint from Novell over Microsoft's licensing practices in 1993, and eventually resulted in the EU ordering Microsoft to divulge certain information about its server products and release a version of Microsoft Windows without Windows Media Player.

==== February 2008 fine ====
On February 27, 2008, the European Union (EU) competitions commission announced its decision to fine the Microsoft Corporation €899 million (US$1.35 billion), approximately 1/10 of the company's net yearly earnings, for failing to comply with the 2004 antitrust order.

The first decision in this antitrust case was given in 2004 citing that Microsoft withheld needed interoperability information from rival software companies which prevented them from making software compatible with Windows. The commission ordered Microsoft to provide this information. Microsoft agreed to this, providing the information for royalty fees of 6.85% of the licensee's revenues for the product on grounds of innovation (specifically, 3.87% for the patent license and of 2.98% for the information license). The EU found these royalty fees unreasonable and Microsoft was ordered to lower them. Microsoft complied with this, adjusting the royalty rates to 1.2% (changing the rates for the licenses to 0.7% and 0.5%, respectively) in the European Union, while keeping the rate the same for the rest of the world. The EU still saw this as an unreasonable rate, and Microsoft, two months after lowering the rates, reduced the rates yet again to a flat rate of €10,000 or a royalty of 0.4% applicable worldwide. Microsoft's royalty rates, which were deemed unreasonable for the period of 15 months between June 21, 2006, and October 21, 2007, are the cause for the fine. So far, the EU has fined Microsoft €1.68 billion in 3 separate fines in this case. This fine will go towards the European Union annual budget.

European Commissioner for Competition Neelie Kroes stated that the fine was "reasonable and proportionate," as the figure could have gone up as high as €1.5 billion, the maximum that the EU commission can impose. She also said that it should act as "a signal to the outside world, and especially Microsoft, that they should stick to the rules" and that "Talk is cheap. Flouting the rules is expensive." Although she also expressed hope that "today's decision closes a dark chapter in Microsoft's record of non-compliance with the Commission."

It is not certain whether Microsoft will appeal this decision. A Microsoft spokesperson has stated that Microsoft will review this latest fine, citing that "The commission announced in October 2007 that Microsoft was in full compliance with the 2004 decision, so these fines are about the past issues that have been resolved." Microsoft's General Counsel Brad Smith commented "It's clearly very important to us as a company that we comply with our obligations under European law. We will study this decision carefully, and if there are additional steps that we need to take in order to comply with it, we will take them." Microsoft had appealed against fines by the EU before, but all the charges were defeated. If Microsoft does not appeal the decision, the company will have 3 months (starting February 27) to pay the fine in full.

The decisions came after Microsoft announced they were disclosing 30,000 pages of previously secret software code last Thursday (February 21). The EU competition commissioner commented that this move "does not necessarily equal a change in business practice."

===== Spanish antitrust investigation =====
In September 2011, the competition commission in Spain began an investigation into Microsoft's licence agreements, which prevent the transfer of Microsoft software to third parties.

==== United States ====
United States v. Microsoft Corp., 87 F. Supp. 2d 30 (D.D.C. 2000) was a set of consolidated civil actions filed against Microsoft Corporation on May 18, 1998, by the United States Department of Justice (DOJ) and twenty U.S. states. Joel I. Klein was the lead prosecutor. The plaintiffs alleged that Microsoft abused monopoly power in its handling of operating system sales and web browser sales. The issue central to the case was whether Microsoft was allowed to bundle its flagship Internet Explorer (IE) web browser software with its Microsoft Windows operating system. Bundling them together is alleged to have been responsible for Microsoft's victory in the browser wars as every Windows user had a copy of Internet Explorer. It was further alleged that this unfairly restricted the market for competing web browsers (such as Netscape Navigator or Opera) that were slow to download over a modem or had to be purchased at a store. Underlying these disputes were questions over whether Microsoft altered or manipulated its application programming interfaces (APIs) to favor Internet Explorer over third party web browsers, Microsoft's conduct in forming restrictive licensing agreements with OEM computer manufacturers, and Microsoft's intent in its course of conduct.

Microsoft stated that the merging of Microsoft Windows and Internet Explorer was the result of innovation and competition, that the two were now the same product and were inextricably linked together and that consumers were now getting all the benefits of IE for free. Those who opposed Microsoft's position countered that the browser was still a distinct and separate product which did not need to be tied to the operating system, since a separate version of Internet Explorer was available for Mac OS. They also asserted that IE was not really free because its development and marketing costs may have kept the price of Windows higher than it might otherwise have been. The case was tried before U.S. District Court Judge Thomas Penfield Jackson. The DOJ was initially represented by David Boies. On June 30, 2004, the U.S. appeals court unanimously approved the settlement with the Justice Department, rejecting objections that the sanctions were inadequate.

==== Acquisition of Activision Blizzard ====
On January 18, 2022, Microsoft announced its intent to acquire Activision Blizzard for $68.7 billion in cash. Under the terms of the agreement, which was finalized on October 13, 2023, Microsoft would own Activision, Blizzard Entertainment, and King under the Microsoft Gaming umbrella. The acquisition proposal itself has reignited antitrust concerns targeted at Microsoft, with mixed reactions from international regulators and rival companies. In December 2022, Microsoft faced a legal action by customers against the acquisition under Clayton Antitrust Act of 1914.

=== Usage of Microsoft Office 365 and Teams in schools and governmental institutions ===
The Court of Justice of the European Union on 16 July 2020 had ruled that "it is illegal to send private data from the EU to the US"

Microsoft Office 365 had been banned from several schools in Europe over privacy concerns.

In March 2024, the European Data Protection Supervisor (EDPS) found that the use of Microsoft 365 by the European Commission (EC) violated "several key data protection rules" of the EU Regulation 2018/1725 that defines privacy rules for EU institutions. The EC was ordered by the EDPS to suspend all Microsoft 365 related data flows that violated the rules.

=== Tax disputes ===
In 2007, the Internal Revenue Service began investigating Microsoft over allegations that the company may have transferred some software rights to its international subsidiaries in an effort to evade paying tax to the United States. In 2014, after Microsoft was held in contempt of court after refusing to hand over the required foreign data, Microsoft filed a Freedom of Information request on September 22, 2014, regarding a contract between law firm Quinn Emmanuel Urqhart and Sullivan and the IRS; when IRS did not respond within the required 20 day period (the IRS responded by saying it needed an extension, but after the time elapsed did not provide the requested information) Microsoft filed a lawsuit against the IRS in November.

=== Other ===
In March 2004, during a consumer class-action lawsuit in Minnesota, internal documents subpoenaed from Microsoft revealed that the company had violated nondisclosure agreements seven years earlier in obtaining business plans from Go Corporation, using them to develop and announce a competing product named PenWindows, and convincing Intel to reduce its investment in Go. After Go was purchased by AT&T and Go's tablet-based computing efforts were shelved, PenWindows development was dropped.

In May 2004, a class-action lawsuit accused Microsoft of overcharging customers in the state of California. The company settled the case for $1.1 billion, and a California court ordered Microsoft to pay an additional $258 million in legal fees (including over $3,000 per hour for the lead attorney in the case, more than $2,000 per hour for colleagues, and in excess of $1,000 per hour for administrative work). A Microsoft attorney responded, "Somebody ends up paying for this. These large fee awards get passed on to consumers." The total bill for legal fees was later reduced to just over $112 million. Because of the structure of the settlement, the law firm which sued Microsoft could end up getting more money from the company than California consumers and schools, the beneficiaries of the settlement.

In 2006, Microsoft initiated an investigation of Lithuanian government institutions for determining whether they choose long-term strategies of the software they use correctly. The investigation, funded by Microsoft itself, will be performed by the Vilnius University together with the Lithuanian Institution of the Free Market, a think tank organization. The investigation was initialised after the government started to prepare 860 thousand litas project to encourage the use of open-source software. The vice-president of Microsoft, Vahe Torossian, stated that "the government should not be technologically subjectivist".

Microsoft was sued for the "Windows Vista Capable" logo and in Iowa. Microsoft Word was also a subject of court case.

On July 12, 2013, Microsoft is suing the U.S. Customs and Border Protection over Google phone ban. Homeland Security Secretary Janet Napolitano is also named in the lawsuit.

== Private ==
Microsoft has also fought numerous legal battles against private companies. The most prominent ones are against:

- Alcatel-Lucent, which won US$1.52 billion in a lawsuit which alleged that Microsoft had infringed its patents on playback of audio files. This ruling was overturned in a higher court.
- Apple Inc. (known as Apple Computer, Inc. at the time), which accused Microsoft in the late 1980s of copying the "look and feel" of the graphical user interface of Apple's operating systems. The courts ruled in favor of Microsoft in 1994. Another suit by Apple accused Microsoft, along with Intel and the San Francisco Canyon Company, in 1995 of knowingly stealing several thousand lines of QuickTime source code in an effort to improve the performance of Video for Windows. After a threat to withdraw support for Office for Mac, this lawsuit was ultimately settled in 1997. Apple agreed to make Internet Explorer the default browser over Netscape, and Microsoft agreed to continue developing Office and other software for the Mac for the next 5 years, purchase $150 million of non-voting Apple stock, and made a quiet payoff estimated to be in the US$500 million-$2 billion range.
- AOL, on behalf of its Netscape division. Netscape (as an independent company) also was involved in the United States v. Microsoft antitrust suit.
- AtomicPark.com, which in 2009 was ordered to pay $1.2 million to Microsoft for selling unauthorized versions of Microsoft software.
- Be Inc., which accused Microsoft of exclusionary and anti-competitive behavior intended to drive Be out of the market. Be even offered to license its Be Operating System (BeOS) for free to any PC vendors who would ship it pre-installed, but the vendors declined due to what Be believes were fears of pricing retaliation from Microsoft: by raising the price of Microsoft Windows for one particular PC vendor, Microsoft could price that vendor's PCs out of the market.
- Bristol Technology, which accused Microsoft illegally withheld Windows source code and used its dominant position with Windows to move into other markets. A ruling later ordered Microsoft to pay $1 million to Bristol Technologies (see also Windows Interface Source Environment).
- Caldera, Inc. in 1996, accused Microsoft of several anti-competitive practices, including vaporware announcements, creating FUD, exclusionary licensing and artificial tying. One of the claims was down to bundling and tying MS-DOS 7 and Windows 4 into a single product (Windows 95) for the sole purpose of eliminating competition, another to having modified Windows 3.1 so that it would not run on DR DOS 6.0 although there was no technical reason for it not to work. Several industry experts revealed that Microsoft put encrypted code, which became known as AARD code, in five otherwise unrelated Microsoft programs in order to prevent the functioning of DR DOS in pre-releases (beta versions) of Windows 3.1, and that it was technically possible to run Windows 4 on DR-DOS 7 after bypassing some new and non-essential interface code through WinGlue. In 2000, Microsoft settled out of court for an undisclosed sum, which in 2009 was revealed to be $280 million, and the Caldera evidence was destroyed in 2003.
- Opera Software, which accused Microsoft of intentionally making its MSN service incompatible with the Opera browser on several occasions.
- Sendo, which accused Microsoft of terminating their partnership so it could steal Sendo's technology to use in Pocket PC 2002 Phone Edition.
- Spyglass, which licensed its browser to Microsoft in return for a percentage of each sale; Microsoft turned the browser into Internet Explorer and bundled it with Windows, giving it away to gain market share but effectively destroying any chance of Spyglass making money from the deal they had signed with Microsoft; Spyglass sued for deception and won an $8 million settlement.
- Stac Electronics, which accused Microsoft of stealing its data compression code and using it in MS-DOS 6.0. Microsoft eventually lost the subsequent Stac v. Microsoft lawsuit and was ordered by a federal court to pay roughly $120 million in compensation.
- Sun Microsystems, which held Microsoft in violation of contract for including a modified version of Java in Microsoft Windows that provided Windows-specific extensions to Sun's Java language; Microsoft lost this decision in court and were forced to stop shipping their Windows-specific Java virtual machine. Microsoft eventually ceased to include any Java Virtual Machine in Windows, and Windows users who require a Java Virtual Machine need to download the software or otherwise acquire a copy from a source other than Microsoft.
- Zhongyi Electronic, which, having licensed two fonts which it had designed to Microsoft for use only in Windows 95, filed suit in China in April 2007, accusing Microsoft of using those fonts in subsequent Windows 98, 2000, XP, Server 2003 and four other Chinese-language Windows operating systems. Beijing's No. 1 intermediate people's court ruled on November 16, 2009, that Microsoft violated the scope of licensing agreements between the two companies. The result of the verdict is that Microsoft has to stop selling Chinese-language versions of the aforementioned operating systems. Microsoft said it will appeal. One of the fonts in question may be SimSun.
- Many other smaller companies have filed patent abuse and predatory practice suits against Microsoft.

=== Patents ===
==== Alcatel-Lucent ====
The dispute between Microsoft and Lucent (and later Alcatel-Lucent) began in 2003 when Lucent Technologies (acquired by Alcatel in 2006) filed suit against Gateway in the U.S. District Court for the Southern District of California in San Diego. Lucent also sued Dell in the U.S. District Court for the Eastern District of Virginia; soon thereafter, that court transferred the Dell case to San Diego, where it was consolidated with the case against Gateway. Lucent claimed in this first San Diego case that Dell and Gateway had violated patents on MP3-related technologies developed by Bell Labs, a division of predecessor company American Telephone & Telegraph. Other patents said to be infringed relate to MPEG video technology, speech technology, internet technology, and other technologies. Microsoft intervened in the lawsuit in April 2003 and Alcatel was added after it acquired Lucent.

After the first San Diego lawsuit was filed, Microsoft and Lucent have filed additional patent lawsuits against each other. In February 2007, Microsoft filed a lawsuit at the International Trade Commission claiming that Alcatel-Lucent infringed its patents. There is a second case in San Diego where Microsoft is asserting that Alcatel-Lucent infringes 10 of its patents, and yet another case in Texas where each alleges that the other is infringing its patents.

==== Burst.com ====
- Burst.com claims that Microsoft stole Burst's patented technology for delivering high speed streaming sound and video content on the internet. Also at issue in the case is a 35-week period of missing emails in the evidence Microsoft handed over to Burst which was discovered by Burst.com's lawyers. Burst accuses Microsoft of crafting a 30-day email deletion policy specifically to cover up illegal activity. Microsoft settled with the company for $60 million in exchange for an agreement to license some of the company's technologies.

==== Eolas ====
- Eolas and University of California, which accused Microsoft of using some of its software patents in their web browser, won $521 million in court; however, Eolas' patents were invalidated in 2012.

==== SurfCast ====
SurfCast is suing Microsoft for infringing patent on Live Tiles.

=== Copyrights ===
==== Apple ====
Apple Computer Inc. v. Microsoft Corporation, 35 F.3d 1435 (9th Cir. 1994) was a copyright infringement lawsuit in which Apple Computer, Inc. (now Apple Inc.) sought to prevent Microsoft Corporation and Hewlett-Packard from using visual graphical user interface (GUI) elements that were similar to those in Apple's Lisa and Macintosh operating systems. Some critics claimed that Apple was really attempting to gain all intellectual property rights over the desktop metaphor for computer interfaces, and perhaps all GUIs, on personal computers. Apple lost all claims in the lawsuit, except that the court ruled that the "trash can" icon and file folder icons from Hewlett-Packard's now-forgotten NewWave windows application were infringing. The lawsuit was filed on March 17, 1988 and lasted four years; the decision was affirmed on appeal in 1994, and Apple's appeal to the U.S. Supreme Court was denied.

=== Trademarks ===
==== Lindows ====
Microsoft v. Lindows.com, Inc. was a court case brought on December 20, 2001, by Microsoft against Lindows, Inc, claiming that the name "Lindows" was a violation of its trademark "Windows". In addition to the United States, Microsoft has also sued Lindows in Sweden, France, Belgium, Luxembourg, the Netherlands and Canada. Michael Robertson has called this situation "Sextuple Jeopardy", an extension of the term double jeopardy.

In response to these lawsuits, Lindows had launched ChoicePC.com, which allows people to purchase lifetime Lindows memberships that includes a free copy of LindowsOS, free LindowsOS upgrades for life, and a ChoicePC.com T-shirt, for US$100. All money from the memberships goes towards helping Lindows in its legal battle against Microsoft.

==== MikeRoweSoft ====
In a legal dispute, Microsoft sued a Canadian high school student named Mike Rowe over the domain name MikeRoweSoft.com. The case received international press attention following Microsoft's perceived heavy handed approach to a 12th grade student's part-time web design business and the subsequent support that Rowe received from the online community. A settlement was eventually agreed, with Rowe granting ownership of the domain to Microsoft in return for training and gifts.

As of this writing, the domain MikeRoweSoft.com still redirects to Microsoft.com.

==== Shah ====
Microsoft sued several parties for contributory cybersquatting—that is, encouraging others (through software and instructional videos) to cybersquat on domain names that infringed on Microsoft's trademarks. Microsoft prevailed in court and also established a precedent that liabilities under the Anticybersquatting Consumer Protection Act (ACPA) include contributory trademark infringement.

==== Windows Commander ====
From 1993 until 2002, Total Commander was called Windows Commander; the name was changed in 2002, out of fear of a lawsuit after the developers received a letter from Microsoft pointing out that the word "windows" was trademarked by Microsoft.

==== wxWindows ====
The wxWindows project was renamed to wxWidgets in September 2003 out of fear of a lawsuit after the founder developer Julian Smart received a letter from Microsoft pointing out that the 'Windows' is a UK trademark owned by Microsoft.

==== Microwindows ====
The Microwindows project was renamed to Nano-X Window System in January 2005, due to legal threats from Microsoft regarding the Windows trademark.

=== Other ===
==== Ticketmaster deep linking case ====
In 1997, Ticketmaster sued Microsoft over practice of deep linking - at the time a controversial practice as it was argued it would bypass advertising on a website's front page - on its Sidewalk.com website, having previously blocked requests coming from the website following a stalemate of an agreement that would allowed such. The case was settled two years later when Microsoft agreed to stop deep linking Ticketmaster on Sidewalk.com.

==== Xbox 360 ====
Microsoft has been accused of deceiving consumers by concealing the high failure rate of its Xbox 360 game console. A woman from California sued Microsoft in October 2008 in Superior Court in Sacramento County, stating that the company violated multiple state consumer-protection and unfair-competition laws. The woman alleged that the company continued to sell the Xbox 360 even though it knew that the console's hardware was likely to fail.

==== OpenAI data scraping ====
In June 2023, a lawsuit claimed that Microsoft's partner and supplier OpenAI scraped 300 billion words online without consent and without registering as a data broker. It was filed in San Francisco, California, by sixteen anonymous plaintiffs. They also claimed that Microsoft and OpenAI continued to unlawfully collect and use personal data from millions of consumers worldwide to train their artificial intelligence models.

In December 2023, The New York Times filed a copyright infringement lawsuit against Microsoft and OpenAI, alleging that the companies training their generative AI models was "unlawful use" of the Times content.
