= Internet Explorer for UNIX =

Web browser by Microsoft for UNIX systems

- Screenshot Internet Explorer 5 on Solaris (CDE)
- Developer: Microsoft
- Initial release: 2001; 25 years ago
- Stable release: 5.0 SP1 / 30 October 2001
- Operating system: Solaris, HP-UX
- Platform: PA-RISC and SPARC
- Type: Web browser
- License: Proprietary
- Website: microsoft.com/unix/ie (archive.org)

Internet Explorer for UNIX is a discontinued version of the Internet Explorer graphical web browser that was available free of charge and produced by Microsoft for use in the X Window System on Solaris or HP-UX. Development ended with a version of Internet Explorer 5 in 2001 and support for it was completely discontinued in 2002.

== Development history ==
In May 1996, it was reported that Steven Guggenheimer confirmed that they were looking into porting Internet Explorer to run on UNIX-like platforms, but were looking into how exactly it should be done. It was further reported that Steve Ballmer, then executive vice president of Microsoft, had shown an interest earlier in the month for a Microsoft browser to run on Unix as part of the strategy to wage the browser wars:

In pursuit of a larger share of the mammoth browser market, Microsoft has been dealing with PC and workstation makers to have its IE browser bundled with newly shipping hardware. Ballmer hinted, however, that not having a Unix browser was posing an obstacle to this OEM-based strategy to try and catch up with No. 1 browser maker Netscape Communications Corp., which holds some 85 percent of the worldwide browser market with its Navigator product line. "We might just have to get one of those", Ballmer said of a Unix-based browser.

In June, Microsoft entered into a contract with Bristol Technology to develop a version of Bristol's porting application Wind/U (archived) to port IE for Windows to Unix. At this time Bristol also had a contract with Microsoft allowing it access to Windows source code from September 1994 to September 1997. The project was officially announced by Microsoft at the end of July 1996 that a native version of IE for "Solaris and other popular variants of UNIX" would be finished by the end of the year, which would have "equivalent functionality as that provided in Microsoft Internet Explorer 3.0", thus "delivering on its commitment to provide full-featured Web browser support on all major operating system platforms" as well as "supporting and promoting open standards, including HTML, ActiveX and Java".

However, following a dispute in March 1997 concerning each other's performance and because of contract negotiations with Bristol to access Windows source code after September 1997 failing, Microsoft reversed course and decided to directly port the Windows version in-house using the MainWin XDE (eXtended Development Environment) application from Mainsoft, the main competitor to Bristol Technology. (Microsoft would later also use MainWin to port Windows Media Player and Outlook Express to Unix.) Now well behind schedule, the 3.0 branch was apparently scrapped in favor of 4.0 (that was released for Windows half a year earlier), which used the new MSHTML (Trident) browser engine. A beta of the Solaris version was made available on November 5, 1997, with a final version expected by March 1998.

Internet Explorer 4 for Solaris

Tod Nielsen, general manager of Microsoft's developer relations group, jokingly declared that he wanted to hold the launch of the browser at the Ripley's Believe It or Not museum in San Francisco due to the skepticism by those who believed the project was vaporware. It was further reported that versions for HP-UX, IBM AIX, and Irix were planned (note that at the time MainWin XDE 3.0 was only available for the "Solaris SPARC 2.51 platform", but MainWin XDE 2.1 was "available on Solaris SPARC 2.51, Solaris Intel 5.5.1, SunOS 4.1.4, Irix 5.3, Irix 6.2, HP UX 10.2 and IBM AIX 4.1.5".) IE 4.0 for Unix on Solaris was released on March 4, 1998. Later that year a version for HP-UX was released.

- March 5, 1998: Microsoft reached a settlement with Bristol which "provided mutual releases for any claims arising out of the IE Agreement".
- 1999 IE 5.0 for Unix on Solaris and HP-UX released.
- 2001 IE 5.0 for Unix Service Pack 1 released for Solaris and HP-UX.

== Versions ==
There are nine versions officially listed by Microsoft, listed below in bold. It is not known why Microsoft omitted references to the other ones from its official list.

Product	SSL	Platform	Version	Release date
4.0 Preview 1		Solaris		1997-11-05
4.0/4.01	40-bit	Solaris	4.71.2011.4	1998-02-24
4.0/4.01	40-bit	HP-UX	4.71.2004.9	1998-02-24
4.0/4.01	128-bit	Solaris	4.71.2011.4	1998-02-24
4.0/4.01	128-bit	HP-UX	4.71.2004.9	1998-02-24
5.0	40-bit	Solaris	5.00.2013.1312	1999-02-02
5.0	40-bit	HP-UX	5.00.2013.1312	1999-03-17
5.0	128-bit	Solaris	5.00.2013.1312	1999-02-02
5.0	128-bit	HP-UX	5.00.2013.1312	1999-03-17
5.0 SP1 Beta	128-bit	Solaris	5.00.2013.2002	2001-03-07
5.0 SP1 Beta	128-bit	HP-UX		2001
5.0 SP1	128-bit	Solaris	5.00.3314.1001	2001-10-30
5.0 SP1	128-bit	HP-UX	5.00.3314.1001	2001-10-30

== 5.0 Readme highlights ==
Notable items from the IE for Unix 5.0 Readme:

- "Internet Explorer 5 for UNIX supports most of the features and technologies of Internet Explorer for Windows, but also differs in some respects. For example, Internet Explorer for UNIX does not support downloadable ActiveX controls or browsing and organizing your local files and folders within the browser window. Other unsupported features include filters/transitions in CSS, the DHTML Editing component, and HTML Applications (HTAs). [...] Internet Explorer for UNIX offers some features not found on the Windows version as well, such as Emacs-style keyboard shortcuts and external program associations."
- Microsoft had a newsgroup named "microsoft.public.inetexplorer.unix" on its public news server msnews.microsoft.com
- "The User Agent String for Internet Explorer 5 is static except for the third field which depends on the Operating System and the processor you are using. Here are some common configurations and the user agent strings generated by Internet Explorer on these platforms:"

SPARC 5, Solaris 2.5.1	Mozilla/4.0 (compatible; MSIE 5.0; SunOS 5.5.1 sun4m; X11)
Any Ultra, Solaris 2.5.1	Mozilla/4.0 (compatible; MSIE 5.0; SunOS 5.5.1 sun4u; X11)
Any Ultra, Solaris 2.6	Mozilla/4.0 (compatible; MSIE 5.0; SunOS 5.6 sun4u; X11)
HP 9000 C-180, HP-UX 10.20	Mozilla/4.0 (compatible; MSIE 5.0; HP-UX B.10.20 9000/780; X11)
HP 9000 K-250, HP-UX 10.20	Mozilla/4.0 (compatible; MSIE 5.0; HP-UX B.10.20 9000/802; X11)

== Disappearance ==
The homepage for IE for Unix was removed from Microsoft's website in the third quarter of 2002 without explanation, replaced with the message: "We sincerely apologize, but Internet Explorer technologies for UNIX are no longer available for download." It was noted however, that while the homepage had been removed, the actual download page remained up for a time. The reason given by Microsoft's PR firm was that "low customer demand for this download did not justify the resources required for continued development".

=== Successors ===
Microsoft's Internet Explorer for Mac OS X was the last browser the company released for a UNIX-related platform until the release of Microsoft Edge for macOS and Linux in 2020.

== See also ==
- List of web browsers
- List of web browsers for Unix and Unix-like operating systems
- Comparison of web browsers
