= WLBS (disambiguation) =

WLBS (91.7 FM) is a radio station in Bristol, Pennsylvania, United States.

WLBS may also refer to:

- World Ladies Billiards & Snooker, the women's division of the World Professional Billiards and Snooker Association
- Windows NT Load Balancing Service, an early version of Microsoft's Network Load Balancing Services
