= Microsoft Institute for High Performance Computing =

The Microsoft Institute for High Performance Computing was created in November 2005 at the University of Southampton. The only one of its kind in the UK. It is one of nine such institutes worldwide.

== History ==
The creation of the institute was announced by Bill Gates during the International Supercomputing Conference in 2005, and the institute itself is currently led by Professor Simon J. Cox while Dr. Kenji Takeda, co-director, left the University of Southampton to join Microsoft.

In 2006 Microsoft was working on a proof-of-concept implementation of a bespoke engineering workflow software for BAE Systems. The large British aerospace company wanted to run its SOLAR software on the Microsoft Cluster Server. The teams at the University of Southampton, BAE Systems and Microsoft managed to build a demonstrator in just 3 weeks. This comprised an SQL Server back-end and a Net 2.0 Web Service.

== Research ==
The institute has conducted research in:

- Computational fluid dynamics
- Computational electromagnetics
- Electrical grid technologies
- Conference XP
- SQL
- WinFS
- Windows Communication Foundation
- Microsoft Cluster Server

== Reception ==
Microsoft Visual Studio's Product Manager Dennis Crain referring to the MIHPC in Southampton said:

"It's an exciting opportunity to have a top engineering school such as Southampton use Microsoft software to solve tough engineering research problems. In this way Southampton will help refine future versions of our new high performance computing product, Windows Compute Cluster Server 2003."

== List of MIHPCs worldwide ==
- University of Southampton
- TACC - University of Texas Austin
- University of Utah
- University of Stuttgart
- Shanghai Jiao Tong University
- Nizhny Novgorod University
- University of Tennessee
- Tokyo Institute of technology
- Shanghai Supercomputer Center
