= System Policy Editor =

Discontinued Windows administration tool

- System Policy Editor in Windows NT 4.0
- Developer(s): Microsoft
- Operating system: Microsoft Windows
- Successor: Group Policy on Windows 2000

System Policy Editor is a graphical tool provided with Windows NT 4.0 Server, and can be installed on Windows 95, Windows NT 4.0 Workstation and Windows 98. System policies are made up from a set of registry entries that control the computer resources available to a user or group of users. These registry entries can be applied to individual users, groups of users, or to anybody logging on to a particular computer.

It works by manipulating Registry and security settings. User-specific settings are stored in the HKEY_CURRENT_USER registry hive. Likewise, machine-specific settings are written under HKEY_LOCAL_MACHINE. ADM files are template files that are used by System Policy Editor to describe where registry-based policy settings are stored in the registry. They also describe the user interface presented to System Policy administrators.

In Windows 2000, the System Policy Editor was replaced with the Group Policy snap-in for Microsoft Management Console.
