= Microsoft Cluster Server =

High-availability cluster software

- Developer: Microsoft
- Operating system: Windows Server 2019; Windows Server 2016; Windows Server 2012 R2; Windows Server 2012; Windows Server 2008 R2; Windows Server 2008; Windows Server 2003 R2; Windows Server 2003; Windows 2000; Windows NT 4.0
- Type: Utility software
- License: Proprietary commercial software, EULA

Microsoft Cluster Server (MSCS) is a computer program that allows server computers to work together as a computer cluster, to provide failover and increased availability of applications, or parallel calculating power in case of high-performance computing (HPC) clusters (as in supercomputing).

Microsoft has three technologies for clustering: Microsoft Cluster Service (MSCS, a HA clustering service), Component Load Balancing (CLB) (part of Application Center 2000), and Network Load Balancing Services (NLB). With the release of Windows Server 2008 the MSCS service was renamed to Windows Server Failover Clustering (WSFC), and the Component Load Balancing (CLB) feature became deprecated.

Prior to Windows Server 2008, clustering required (per Microsoft KBs) that all nodes in the clusters to be as identical as possible from hardware, drivers, firmware, all the way to software. After Windows Server 2008 however, Microsoft modified the requirements to state that only the operating system needs to be of the same level (such as patch level).

== Background ==
Cluster Server was codenamed "Wolfpack" during its development. Windows NT Server 4.0, Enterprise Edition was the first version of Windows to include the MSCS software. The software has since been updated with each new server release. The cluster software evaluates the resources of servers in the cluster and chooses which are used based on criteria set in the administration module. In June 2006, Microsoft released Windows Compute Cluster Server 2003, the first high-performance computing (HPC) cluster technology offering from Microsoft.

== History ==
During Microsoft's first attempt at development of a cluster server, originally priced at $10,000, ran into problems causing the software to fail because of software defects in application software causing fail-over forcing the workload from two servers to a single server. This results in poor allocation of resources, poor performance of the servers, and very poor reviews from analysts.

The announcement of a new update to the Microsoft Cluster Server software came in 1998, promising new features in 1999, in the newest addition in the line of Windows NT software in the form of Windows NT 5.0 Enterprise Edition, also promising support for 4 nodes post release of NT 5.0.

Microsoft's first attempt at pushing the cluster server software was at the 2005 Super-Computing conference in Seattle the new software being developed, Windows Compute Cluster Server 2003 (Windows CCS 2003).

On May 8, 2006, Microsoft reported the release of the full-featured Windows Compute Cluster Server 2003, intended for industrial use, and the Windows Compute Cluster Server 2003 R2, intended for small businesses, software to the public for purchase in summer 2006.
