= Windows NT 4.0 =

1996 Microsoft operating system version

- Version of the Windows NT operating system

- Screenshot of Windows NT 4.0, displaying its desktop, taskbar, Active Desktop, Web Widgets and Welcome screen
- Developer: Microsoft
- Working state: No longer supported
- Source model: Closed source
- Released to manufacturing: July 31, 1996; 30 years ago
- General availability: August 24, 1996; 30 years ago (Workstation); September 1996; 30 years ago (Server)
- Final release: Service Pack 6a with Post SP6a Security Rollup (4.0.1381.7097) / July 26, 2001; 25 years ago
- Marketing target: Business and Server
- Supported platforms: IA-32, Alpha, (Note: DEC Alpha is supported in Windows NT 4.0 in 32-bit versions only, using a 32-bit application binary interface on an otherwise native 64-bit platform. No versions of Windows NT for the 64-bit Alpha (AXP64) platform were available to the public; they were only developed internally by Microsoft and mainly served as testing grounds for the 64-bit Itanium (IA-64) platform when no other Itanium hardware was available and was still in development.) MIPS, PowerPC
- Kernel type: Hybrid
- Userland: Windows API, NTVDM, OS/2 1.x, POSIX.1, SFU (SP3+)
- License: Commercial proprietary software
- Preceded by: Windows NT 3.51 (1995)
- Succeeded by: Windows 2000 (1999)
- Official website: Windows NT 4.0 (archived at Wayback Machine)

Support status
- Embedded: Mainstream support ended on June 30, 2003. Extended support ended on July 11, 2006.
- Server: Mainstream support ended on December 31, 2002. Extended support ended on December 31, 2004.
- Workstation: Mainstream support ended on June 30, 2002. Extended support ended on June 30, 2004.
- Extended Security Updates (ESU) Support: All editions were eligible for a paid Extended Security Updates (ESU) program. It allowed users to purchase security updates on a pay-per-incident plan. Security updates were available until December 31, 2006.

Windows NT 4.0 is a major release of the Windows NT operating system developed by Microsoft, targeting the data server and personal workstation markets. It is the direct successor to Windows NT 3.51, and was released to manufacturing on July 31, 1996, and then to retail on August 24, 1996, with the Server versions released to retail in early September 1996.

Its most prominent user-facing change was the adoption of Windows 95's user interface, introducing features such as the Start menu and taskbar to the Windows NT product line. It also includes various performance and stability improvements to system-level components, as well as new components such as a cryptography API, DCOM, TAPI 2.0, and the Task Manager, and limited support for DirectX. Over its support lifecycle, NT 4.0 received various updates and service packs offering patches, enhancements to its hardware support, and other new components. Two new editions of NT 4.0 were released post-launch, including a modular variant for embedded systems, and the Terminal Server edition.

NT 4.0 remained in use by businesses for a number of years, despite Microsoft's many efforts to get customers to upgrade to Windows 2000 and newer versions. NT 4.0 was the last NT release to support the Alpha, MIPS or PowerPC CPU architectures as Windows 2000 runs solely on x86, and to use the "NT" name in its product line (although Windows 2000 carried the designation "Built on NT Technology" in several places).

Most editions of NT 4.0 were succeeded by Windows 2000 on February 17, 2000. Mainstream support for Windows NT 4.0 Workstation ended on June 30, 2002, following by extended support ending on June 30, 2004. Windows NT 4.0 Server mainstream support ended on December 31, 2002, with extended support ending on December 31, 2004. Windows NT 4.0 Embedded would be succeeded by Windows XP Embedded; mainstream support ended on June 30, 2003, followed by extended support on July 11, 2006.

== New and updated features ==
Windows NT 4.0 introduced the user interface of Windows 95 to the Windows NT family, including the Windows shell, File Explorer (known as Windows NT Explorer at the time), and the use of "My" nomenclature for shell folders (e.g. My Computer). It also includes most components introduced with Windows 95. Internally, Windows NT 4.0 was known as the Shell Update Release (SUR). While many administrative tools, notably User Manager for Domains, Server Manager and Domain Name Service Manager still used the old graphical user interfaces, the Start menu in Windows NT 4.0 separated the per-user shortcuts and folders from the shared shortcuts and folders by a separator line. Several features from Microsoft Plus! for Windows 95 such as the Space Cadet pinball table, font smoothing, showing window contents while dragging, high-color icons and stretching the wallpaper to fit the screen were also included by default in Windows NT 4.0.

Although the chief enhancement has been the addition of the Windows 95 shell, there are several major performance, scalability and feature improvements to the core architecture, kernel, USER32, COM and MSRPC. Windows NT 4.0 also introduced the concept of system policies and the System Policy Editor.

Other important features were:

- Crypto API
- Telephony API 2.0 with limited Unimodem support, which was the first release of TAPI on Windows NT
- DCOM and new OLE features
- Microsoft Message Queuing (MSMQ), which improved interprocess communication
- Winsock 2 and the TCP/IP stack improvements
- File system defragmentation support
- Internet Explorer 2
- Partial Bluetooth 1.0 support (Service Pack 5 and above)

The server editions of Windows NT 4.0 include Internet Information Services 2.0, Microsoft FrontPage 1.1, NetShow Services, Remote Access Service (which includes a PPTP server for VPN functionality) and Multi-Protocol Routing service. There are new administrative wizards and a lite version of the Network Monitor utility shipped with System Management Server. The Enterprise edition introduced Microsoft Cluster Server.

One significant difference from previous versions of Windows NT is that the Graphics Device Interface (GDI) is moved into kernel mode rather than being in user mode in the CSRSS process. This eliminated a process-to-process context switch in calling GDI functions, resulting in a significant performance improvement over Windows NT 3.51, particularly in the graphical user interface. This, however, also mandated that graphics and printer drivers had to run in kernel mode as well, resulting in potential stability issues.

Windows NT 4.0 was the first release of Microsoft Windows to include DirectX as standard—version 2 shipped with the initial release of Windows NT 4.0, and version 3 was included with the release of Service Pack 3 in mid-1997. However advanced hardware accelerated Direct3D and DirectSound multimedia features were never available on Windows NT 4.0. Later versions of DirectX were not released for Windows NT 4.0. However, OpenGL was supported; it was used by Quake 3 and Unreal Tournament.

In early releases of 4.0, numerous stability issues did occur as graphics and printer vendors had to change their drivers to be compatible with the kernel mode interfaces exported by GDI. The change to move the GDI to run in the same process context as its caller was prompted by complaints from NT Workstation users about real-time graphics performance, but this change put a considerable onus on hardware manufacturers to update device drivers.

Windows NT 4.0 also included a new Windows Task Manager utility. Previous versions of Windows NT included the Task List utility, but it only shows applications currently on the desktop. To monitor CPU and memory usage, users were forced to use Performance Monitor. The task manager offers a more convenient way of getting a snapshot of all the processes running on the system at any given time.

Windows NT 4.0 upgraded NTVDM's x86 emulation in the RISC versions from 286 to 486. Sysprep was introduced as a deployment tool with Windows NT 4.0.

x86 versions of Windows NT 4.0 require the BIOS firmware. RISC versions of Windows NT 4.0 require the ARC firmware.

=== Comparison with Windows 95 ===
Windows NT 4.0, like the previous and next releases of Windows NT, is a fully 32-bit OS, while Windows 95 is a 16/32-bit hybrid OS.

Windows NT 4.0 provided much greater stability than Windows 95 through the use of protected memory and the hardware abstraction layer. Direct hardware access was disallowed and misbehaving programs were terminated without the need for the computer to be restarted. The trade-off was that NT required more memory (32 MB for normal desktop use, 128 MB or more for heavy 3D applications) in comparison to a consumer targeted product such as Windows 95.

While nearly all programs written for Windows 95 run on Windows NT, many 3D games would not, partly because of limited DirectX support for Windows NT 4.0. Third-party device drivers were an alternative to access the hardware directly, but poorly written drivers became a frequent source of system crashes.

In spite of shipping a year later than Windows 95, by default there is no Legacy Plug and Play support and no Device Manager on Windows NT 4.0, which greatly simplifies installation of hardware devices (although limited support could be installed later). However, EISA bus and PCI bus is supported by Windows NT 4.0. Many basic DOS programs would run; however, graphical DOS programs would not run because of the way they accessed graphics hardware. Although Windows NT 4.0 introduced an application programming interface (API) for defragmentation, there was no built-in defragmentation utility, unlike Windows 95. Also, Windows NT 4.0 lacked USB support, a preliminary version of which would be added to OEM editions of Windows 95 in OSR 2.1; standardization of USB with support enabled would come later on NT 4.0's successor Windows 2000. AGP support can be added with SP3 or later. Large disk (> 8 GB) support can be added with SP4 or later. FAT32 is not officially supported in Windows NT 4.0.

The difference between the NT family and 9x family would remain until the release of Windows XP in 2001. At that time, the APIs — such as OpenGL and DirectX — had matured sufficiently to be more efficient to write for common PC hardware, and the hardware itself had become powerful enough to handle the API processing overhead.

The maximum amount of supported physical random-access memory (RAM) in Windows NT 4.0 is 4 GB, which is the maximum possible for a 32-bit operating system that does not support PAE. By comparison, Windows 95 fails to boot on computers with more than approximately 480 MB of memory.

Like previous versions of NT, version 4.0 can run on multiple processor architectures. Windows 95, however, can only run on x86.

== System requirements ==
Category	Minimum	Recommended
Processor	Intel 486 at 33 MHz	Pentium or Pentium Pro
Memory	16 MB (8 MB for Embedded)	32 MB or higher
Video card	VGA	SVGA
Hard disk drive standard	IDE, EIDE, SCSI or ESDI	IDE, EIDE, SCSI or ESDI
Free hard disk drive space	128 MB (64 MB for Embedded)	256 MB or higher
Installation media	CD-ROM drive	CD-ROM drive

== Editions ==
Logo of Windows NT 4.0 Workstation

=== Client ===
- Windows NT 4.0 Workstation was designed for use as a general business desktop operating system.

=== Servers ===
- Windows NT 4.0 Server, released in 1996, was designed for small-scale business server systems. It was also included in versions 4.0 and 4.5 of the BackOffice Small Business Server suite.
- Windows NT 4.0 Server, Enterprise Edition, released in 1997, is the precursor to the Enterprise line of the Windows server family (Advanced Server in Windows 2000). Enterprise Server was designed for high-demand, high-traffic networks. Windows NT 4.0 Server, Enterprise Edition includes Service Pack 3. The Enterprise Edition saw the introduction of the /3GB boot flag, which changed the default virtual address space mapping from 2 GB kernel and 2 GB user space to 1 GB kernel and 3 GB userland. This version also sees the first introduction of cluster service.
- Windows NT 4.0 Terminal Server Edition (known as Windows-based Terminal Server 4.0 and Windows Terminal Server 4.0 in beta builds) was released on June 16, 1998, which allows the users to log on remotely. The same functionality was called Terminal Services in Windows 2000 and later server releases, and also powers the Remote Desktop feature that first appeared in Windows XP and later versions of Windows. Windows NT 4.0 Terminal Server Edition, like Windows NT 4.0 Server, Enterprise Edition, includes Service Pack 3.

=== Embedded ===
- Windows NT 4.0 Embedded (abbreviated NTe) is an edition of Windows NT 4.0 that was aimed at computer-powered major appliances, vending machines, ATMs and other devices that cannot be considered general-purpose computers per se. It is the same system as the standard Windows NT 4.0, but it comes packaged in a database of components and dependencies, from which a developer can choose individual components to build customized setup CDs and hard disk boot images. Windows NT 4.0 Embedded includes Service Pack 5. It was succeeded by Windows XP Embedded. Microsoft ended mainstream support for Windows NT 4.0 Embedded on June 30, 2003, and received three years of extended support, which means that support for Windows NT 4.0 Embedded ended on the same day support for Windows 98, Windows 98 SE and Windows Me ended on July 11, 2006.

== Updates and service packs ==
Service pack	Release date
Service Pack 1 (SP1)	October 16, 1996
Service Pack 2 (SP2)	December 14, 1996
Service Pack 3 (SP3)	May 15, 1997
Service Pack 4 (SP4)	October 25, 1998
Service Pack 5 (SP5)	May 4, 1999
Service Pack 6 (SP6)	October 27, 1999
Service Pack 6a (SP6a)	November 22, 1999
Post SP6a Security Rollup	July 26, 2001

Windows NT 4.0 received six service packs during its lifecycle, as well as numerous service rollup packages and option packs. Only the first service pack was made available for the MIPS architecture, Service Pack 2 was the final release for the PowerPC architecture, and Service Pack 6 was the final release for the Alpha architecture. Service Pack 6a (SP6a) is the last released service pack for Windows NT 4.0. Service Pack 7 was planned at one stage in early 2001, but this became the Post SP6a Security Rollup and not a full service pack, released on July 26, 2001, 16 months following the release of Windows 2000 and nearly three months prior to the release of Windows XP.

In addition to bug fixes, the service packs also added a multitude of new features such as Ultra DMA mode for disk drives along with bus mastering, newer versions of Internet Information Services (IIS), user accounts and user profile improvements, smart card support, improved symmetric multiprocessing (SMP) scalability, clustering capabilities, MMX / 3DNow! / SSE / SSE2 support, AGP support, COM support improvements, Event Log service, MS-CHAPv2 and NTLMv2, SMB packet signing, Syskey, boot improvements, WINS improvements, Routing and Remote Access Service (RRAS), PPTP, DCOM/HTTP tunneling improvements, IGMPv2, WMI, Active Accessibility, NTFS 3.0 support, and partial Bluetooth 1.0 support among others.

In 1997, Microsoft released an optional update known as the "Option Pack" to add new technologies slated to be included in Windows 2000; it included IIS 4.0 with Active Server Pages (ASP), FrontPage Server Extensions, Certificate Server, MTS, MSMQ, CDONTS, Internet Authentication Service (IAS), Indexing Service, Microsoft Management Console 1.0, Microsoft Site Server, Microsoft Transaction Server, and SMTP and NNTP services. Several features such as Distributed File System and Windows NT Load Balancing Service (WLBS) were delivered as addons for Windows NT Server 4.0. The Routing and Remote Access Service was also a downloadable feature which replaced Windows NT 4.0's separate RAS and Multi-Protocol Routing services.

Internet Explorer 4 optionally includes the Windows Desktop Update, which integrates Internet Explorer with Windows Explorer and adds additional features to the Windows NT shell such as Active Desktop.

The last version of Microsoft Office available for Windows NT 4.0 is Office XP (released in May 2001). Similarly, Windows Media Player 7.0 (which was released in June 2000) and DirectX 3.0a (which was released in December 1996) are the last versions of Windows Media Player and DirectX available for Windows NT 4.0, respectively. The last versions of .NET Framework and Windows Installer available for Windows NT 4.0 are .NET Framework 1.1 with SP1 (released in August 2004) and Windows Installer 2.0 (released in August 2001), respectively. The last version of Internet Explorer available for Windows NT 4.0 is Internet Explorer 6 with SP1, (released in August 2002).

== Resource Kits ==
Microsoft released five revisions of the Windows NT 4.0 Workstation and Server Resource Kit (original release plus four supplements) which contained a large number of tools and utilities, such as desktops.exe which allowed the user to have multiple desktops, as well as third-party software. The Resource Kit also included the Desktop Themes utility from Microsoft Plus! for Windows 95.

== Support lifecycle ==
Windows NT 4.0 was succeeded by Windows 2000. It also could be directly upgraded to Windows XP Professional on x86-based systems only.

Microsoft stopped providing security updates for Windows NT 4.0 Workstation on June 30, 2004, Windows NT 4.0 Server on December 31, 2004, and Windows NT 4.0 Embedded on July 11, 2006, due to major security flaws including Microsoft Security Bulletin MS03-010, which according to Microsoft could not be patched without significant changes to the core operating system. According to the security bulletin, "Due to the fundamental differences between Windows NT 4.0 and Windows 2000 and its successors, it is infeasible to rebuild the software for Windows NT 4.0 to eliminate the vulnerability. To do so would require re-architecting a very significant amount of the Windows NT 4.0 operating system, and there would be no assurance that applications designed to run on Windows NT 4.0 would continue to operate on the patched system."

Between June 2003 and June 2007, 127 security flaws were identified and patched in Windows 2000 Server, many of which may also affect Windows NT 4.0 Server; however, Microsoft does not test security bulletins against unsupported software.

An independent project named Windows Update Restored aims to restore the Windows Update websites for older versions of Windows, including Windows NT 4.0.

== Source code leak ==
On or shortly before February 12, 2004, "portions of the Microsoft Windows 2000 and Windows NT 4.0 source code were illegally made available on the Internet." The source of the leak was later traced to Mainsoft, a Windows Interface Source Environment partner. Microsoft issued the following statement:

"Microsoft source code is both copyrighted and protected as a trade secret. As such, it is illegal to post it, make it available to others, download it or use it."

Despite the warnings, the archive containing the leaked code spread widely on the file-sharing networks. On February 16, 2004, an exploit "allegedly discovered by an individual studying the leaked source code" for certain versions of Microsoft Internet Explorer was reported. On April 15, 2015, GitHub took down a repository containing a copy of the Windows NT 4.0 source code that originated from the leak.
