= Generative AI Copyright Disclosure Act =

2024 legislation in California, US

- Long title: H.R.7913 – To require a notice be submitted to the Register of Copyrights with respect to copyrighted works used in building generative AI systems, and for other purposes.

Legislative history
- Introduced in the United States House of Representatives by Adam Schiff (D–CA) on April 9, 2024

The Generative AI Copyright Disclosure Act is a piece of legislation introduced by California Representative Adam Schiff in the United States Congress on April 9, 2024. It concerns the transparency of companies regarding their use of copyrighted work to train their generative artificial intelligence (AI) models. The legislation requires the submission of a notice regarding the identity and the uniform resource locator (URL) address of the copyrighted works used in the training data to the Register of Copyrights at least 30 days before the public release of the new or updated version of the AI model; it does not ban the use of copyrighted works for AI training. The bill's requirements would apply retroactively to prior AI models.

Violation penalties would start at US$5,000. The legislation does not have a maximum penalty assessment that can be charged.

The bill by Schiff was introduced a few days after The New York Times published an article regarding the business activities of major tech firms, including Google and Meta, in the training of their generative AI platforms on April 6, 2024.

The legislation is supported by the Professional Photographers of America (PPA), SAG-AFTRA, the Writers Guild of America, the International Alliance of Theatrical Stage Employees (IATSE), the Recording Industry Association of America (RIAA), and others.

== See also ==
- Artificial intelligence and copyright
- Regulation of artificial intelligence in the United States
