= Windows Interface Source Environment =

Licensing program by Microsoft

Windows Interface Source Environment (or WISE) was a licensing program from Microsoft which allowed developers to recompile and run Windows-based applications on UNIX and Macintosh platforms.

WISE SDKs were based on an emulation of the Windows API which could run on Unix and Macintosh platforms.

== History ==
WISE was issued in 1994. WISE software development kits were not directly provided by Microsoft. Instead, Microsoft established partnerships with several software providers (which needed to have access to Windows internals source code), which in turn sold WISE SDKs to end-users. A few software providers provided WISE SDKs or emulators, mainly:

- Mainsoft developed a product called Mainwin, which provided an implementation of MFC on Unix platforms.
- Bristol Technology Inc. developed Wind/U, which ran on top of Motif.
- Insignia Solutions provided an emulator called Softwindows.
- Locus Computing Corporation provided an emulator called Merge.

=== Unfair use of Microsoft dominant position ===
The WISE program, which was discontinued shortly after its inception, was seen by some as a Trojan horse designed by Microsoft to penetrate the Unix market. Companies which provided WISE SDKs needed to have access to Windows source code, which made them dependent on Microsoft's good will. In 1999, Bristol Technology Inc., a software company which provided a WISE SDK, sued Microsoft, arguing that it illegally withheld Windows source code and used its dominant position with Windows to move into other markets. A ruling later ordered Microsoft to pay $1 million to Bristol Technologies.

=== Source code leak ===
To be able to develop WISE SDKs, software providers needed to have access to Windows internals source code. In 2004, more than 30,000 source files from Windows 2000 and Windows NT 4.0 were leaked to the internet. It was later discovered that the source of the leak originated from Mainsoft, one of the WISE software providers.

== See also ==
- Captive NTFS
- NDISwrapper
- Shared Source Common Language Infrastructure
- Wine (software)
