= The New York Times v. Microsoft and OpenAI =

AI copyright lawsuit

- Court: United States District Court for the Southern District of New York
- Started: December 27, 2023
- Docket nos.: 1:23-cv-11195-SHS

Court membership
- Judge sitting: Sidney H. Stein

The New York Times Co. v. Microsoft Corp. et al. is a copyright infringement lawsuit filed by The New York Times (NYT) against Microsoft and OpenAI in December 2023. The lawsuit alleges that OpenAI trained its artificial intelligence (AI) models on NYT content without authorization and that OpenAI and Microsoft’s products can reproduce portions of copyrighted articles, which the Times states competed with its journalism. According to the Times, it is the first major news organization to sue OpenAI and Microsoft for alleged copyright infringements.

OpenAI stated that it was surprised by the lawsuit and argued that its use of copyrighted materials to train AI models constitutes fair use under U.S. copyright law and that its products did not serve as a market substitution for the Times. In 2025, the presiding judge denied most of OpenAI's motions to dismiss, allowing the majority of the Times' claims to go forward.

== Background ==
=== Journalism and AI companies ===
Publishers and news organizations have faced declining advertising revenues for decades. Against this backdrop, some publishers have pursued licensing agreements with AI companies as a potential source of revenue. In July 2023, the Associated Press announced a licensing agreement with OpenAI allowing the company to use portions of the outlet’s news archive to train AI models. In December 2023, Axel Springer, the publisher of Business Insider, Politico, Die Welt, and Bild, entered into a separate agreement with OpenAI that permitted ChatGPT to summarize content from its publications in exchange for licensing fees. Since then, other publishers have also entered into licensing arrangements with AI companies. According to The Information, some licensing agreements between publishers and AI companies have been valued between $1 million and $5 million annually.

Other news organizations have taken a more restricted approach. Several publishers, including CNN, The Washington Post, and The New York Times, have blocked web crawlers associated with OpenAI from accessing their content to prevent their content from being used for AI training. Some media organizations have expressed concern about entering into agreements with technology companies after previous dependence on digital platforms for referral traffic, which later declined since platforms reduced the prominence of news content.

=== Related cases ===
The Times' suit was filed against the backdrop of other litigation against generative AI companies concerning copyrighted works in model training. In July 2023, a class action suit, joined by comedian Sarah Silverman, author Ta-Nehisi Coates, and others, was filed against Meta Platforms for training its AI models on their works, alleging that the company had infringed their copyrights by using their materials without permission. Meta stated that using the authors' works in its model constituted fair use. In 2025, Judge Vince Chhabria dismissed the class action suit. He stated that his ruling "does not stand for the proposition that Meta's use of copyrighted materials to train its language models is lawful," noting that the plaintiffs did not demonstrate that Meta’s use of their works caused evidence of market dilution.

In September 2023, a group of authors, including George R. R. Martin and Jodi Picoult, filed a lawsuit against OpenAI, alleging that the company had infringed their copyrights by using their works to train its AI models without authorization. OpenAI responded that it respects authors' rights and engages with writers regarding concerns about artificial intelligence. In 2025, Judge Sidney H. Stein denied OpenAI's motion to dismiss, noting that the plaintiffs had plausibly alleged that ChatGPT could generate outputs resembling their copyrighted works. He did not rule on whether OpenAI's use of the works constituted fair use.

== Case ==
On December 27, 2023, The New York Times filed suit against OpenAI and Microsoft in the United States District Court for the Southern District of New York, alleging copyright infringement and trademark dilution. Prior to filing, the Times and OpenAI had engaged in negotiations over a licensing agreement; those talks broke down without resolution.

The complaint alleged that the defendants trained their AI models on millions of Times articles without authorization and that their chatbots reproduced the paper's reporting in a manner that directly competed with it, causing a loss of subscribers and advertising revenue. The Times further alleged that OpenAI's ChatGPT and Microsoft's Copilot had produced near-verbatim replicas of copyrighted articles, that the chatbots generated hallucinated content falsely attributed to the Times, and that Times content represented one of the largest proprietary sources of training data for the defendants' models.

Microsoft was named as a co-defendant on the grounds that its business is closely tied to OpenAI's and that Copilot had also used the paper's content without permission to build a competing product.

The complaint did not specify a damages amount but indicated the paper would seek billions of dollars. The Times further requested that the court order the destruction of any datasets incorporating its works, as well as a trial by jury.

In response to the lawsuit, OpenAI published a blog post stating that the company was in negotiations with the Times and was taken by surprise by the lawsuit. In February 2024, the defendants filed motions to dismiss, with OpenAI asserting a fair use defense on the grounds that its products were transformative and not a market substitute for the newspaper. OpenAI further stated that the Times had manipulated its products to produce evidence of verbatim reproductions, which violated the company's terms of use, and argued that certain claims were time-barred under copyright law's three-year statute of limitations.

The New York Daily News and the Center for Investigative Reporting, which had each filed separate actions against the defendants, were later consolidated into the Times' suit before Judge Sidney H. Stein.

On March 26, 2025, Judge Stein denied the motions to dismiss in large part, allowing the central copyright infringement claims to proceed while narrowing the scope of the case by dismissing several claims brought under the Digital Millennium Copyright Act.

In June 2026, the Times sought to amend its complaint to allege that Microsoft had encouraged OpenAI to use the newspaper's articles without authorization. The proposed amended complaint also dropped two claims of trademark dilution and contributory copyright infringement.

In September 2026, the U.S. Department of Justice (DOJ) filed a brief supporting OpenAI, stating that it generally rejected the argument that training AI models on copyrighted text constitutes copyright infringement. According to Reuters, it was the first time that the U.S. government has taken a position on copyright litigation about the use of copyrighted materials to train AI.

On September 17, 2026, an unredacted court filing by The New York Times was unsealed, revealing candid statements by executives of OpenAI and Microsoft about their LLM products. The statements included a Microsoft executive referring to LLM content scraping as "an astonishing theft of unprecedented proportions". With this filing, the Times asked for summary judgment in the case.

== Analysis and reception ==
The case has been described by legal analysts and media commentators in The Washington Post, The Wall Street Journal, and other outlets as one of the most significant copyright disputes involving AI with implications for the broader media industry and publishers. According to Reuters, AI proponents have said that lawsuits such as the Times case could limit development in the AI industry, as developers had expected protection under fair use. Some copyright holders, including the Authors Guild, have said that AI companies should compensate creators for using copyrighted works in model training, noting that such works contribute value to AI systems. The News/Media Alliance, a trade association representing more than 2,000 news outlets, supported the Times' lawsuit.
