= AtomicPark.com =

Defunct online software retailer

AtomicPark.com, LLC
- Type: Private
- Industry: Retail
- Founded: 1998
- Defunct: 2007
- Headquarters: Milwaukee, Wisconsin
- Products: Software & Video Games
- Website: www.atomicpark.com

AtomicPark.com was an online software retailer. Founded in 1998, the company was based in Milwaukee, Wisconsin. It offered retail box and direct downloads of software titles from major manufacturers. The company was awarded "Future 50" status by the Metropolitan Milwaukee Association of Commerce (MMAC) in 2002, 2003 and 2005.

== History ==
In 2001, when credit card numbers were stolen from the company, AtomicPark.com reported it to the FBI.

In 2006, AtomicPark.com increased its product line from software to video games, computer hardware, and consumer electronics. The same year the company was listed in the "Top 500 Guide" by InternetRetailer.com.

In March 2007, AtomicPark.com's banking institution called the loan it had made to the company, sweeping all cash from the company's bank accounts. This resulted in vendors and employees not getting paid and led to the reduction of the workforce to four employees. The company had employed nearly 40 employees during its peak.

In 2007, Microsoft sued the company in federal court, claiming that AtomicPark.com had been selling unauthorized versions of its software since 2000. The company was ordered to pay $1.2 million to Microsoft for selling counterfeit software.
