= Bristol Technology =

American software company

Bristol Technology Inc.
- Company type: Private
- Founded: Ridgefield, Connecticut, USA (January 1991)
- Headquarters: Danbury, Connecticut, United States
- Products: Wind/U; HyperHelp; XPrinter; TransactionVision; Kenosia DataAlchemy

Bristol Technology Inc. was a software development company founded in January 1991 by Keith, Ken, and Jean Blackwell. The company's original product idea, Wind/U, was an implementation of the Windows API (application programming interface) on non-Windows operating systems (such as UNIX). In March 2007, Bristol was purchased by the information technology corporation Hewlett-Packard for an undisclosed amount.

== History ==
=== 1991–1997: Developer tool years ===
Bristol Technology began as a software development tools company with $100,000 of seed investment from company insiders. Throughout the 1990s, Bristol developed a series of successful cross-platform developer tools which were used by over 1,000 corporate customers. From 1992 revenue base of $500,000, Bristol revenue grew by 70% annually over the next five years; reaching the Inc. 500 and being ranked #1 on Connecticut's Fast 50.

=== 1998–2001: Microsoft litigation ===
Windows Interface Source Environment (WISE) was a licensing program from Microsoft which allowed developers to recompile and run Windows-based applications on UNIX and Macintosh platforms. WISE Software development kits were not directly provided by Microsoft. Instead, Microsoft established partnerships to software providers such as Bristol Technology which in turn sold WISE software development kits (SDKs) to end-users.

In August 1998, Bristol filed a federal antitrust suit against Microsoft Corporation, accusing Microsoft of entangling Bristol in a charade to stifle competition from other operating systems: UNIX, Compaq's OpenVMS, and IBM's OS/390. Bristol alleged that after initially approaching Bristol in 1991 and creating a dependency for Bristol and its customers on the Windows programming interfaces, Microsoft was then seeking to end access to this technology on all but Windows operating systems.

In the lawsuit, Bristol sought unspecified damages for and injunctive relief from Microsoft's alleged anti competitive behavior. The injunction would have required Microsoft to provide Bristol with source code for future versions of Windows operating systems, including Microsoft Windows NT 4 and Windows NT 5.

Bristol and Microsoft went to trial in the summer of 1999 in Federal Court in Bridgeport, Connecticut. Federal judge Janet Hall presided over the jury trial. Subsequently, the jury ruled that operating systems were not a definable market, thus Bristol did not have standing to sue under antitrust law. The jury did find that Microsoft violated Connecticut's Unfair Trade Practices Act; however, the jury could not quantify damages and only awarded Bristol $1. In a later ruling, Judge Hall awarded Bristol $1 million in punitive damages and $3.7 million in legal fees. In February 2001, Bristol and Microsoft reached a settlement agreement ending nearly four years of legal battles.

=== 2001–2007: Rebuilding and purchase ===
Following the settlement of the lawsuit with Microsoft, Bristol once again focused on building the company. As a result of the legal battle with Microsoft, beginning in 1999, Bristol had begun two new R&D efforts. One of those efforts would subsequently result in a new wholly owned subsidiary, Kenosia Corporation. Kenosia's flagship product, DataAlchemy, was used by major consumer packaged goods companies for performing analysis on consumer data. Kenosia was sold by Bristol to Halo Technology in 2005.

Bristol's second R&D effort eventually yielded U.S. patent #7,003,781 and a new product, TransactionVision. TransactionVision provided organizations the ability to non-intrusively track electronic transactions throughout a heterogeneous IT infrastructure. In conjunction with its R&D efforts, Bristol raised $9.1 million in venture capital in a round that was led by Jerusalem Venture Partners (JVP) and Apax Partners for the first time in the company's history in 2003.

From 2003 through 2006, Bristol established TransactionVision in the Business Transaction Management (BTM) market. The company was purchased by Hewlett-Packard in 2007 for the purpose of adding TransactionVision to HP's Business Technology Optimization (BTO) line of products.
