= Network Load Balancing Services =

Microsoft Windows Server load balancing feature

Network Load Balancing (NLB), historically known as Network Load Balancing Services (NLBS), is a Microsoft Windows Server feature that implements clustering and load balancing to provide high availability and high reliability, as well as high scalability. NLBS is intended for applications with relatively small data sets that rarely change (one example would be web pages), and do not have long-running in-memory states. These types of applications are called stateless applications, and typically include Web, File Transfer Protocol (FTP), and virtual private networking (VPN) servers. Every client request to a stateless application is a separate transaction, so it is possible to distribute the requests among multiple servers to balance the load. One attractive feature of NLBS is that all servers in a cluster monitor each other with a heartbeat signal, so there is no single point of failure.

Because it operates at the network level rather than the application level, NLB does not support the automatic removal of a failed server from a cluster based on application health, unless the server is completely offline or its NLB service is stopped. This architectural limitation has remained consistent from Windows Server 2003 through modern releases. For example, if a web server is returning an error page instead of correct content, it is still perceived as "alive" by NLB. As such, a monitoring script or third-party application load balancer is typically required on every participating node to check the correctness of local web page delivery, and call the nlb.exe command-line utility to add or remove itself from the cluster as needed.

== History ==
Windows NT Load Balancing Service (WLBS) is a feature of Windows NT that provides load balancing and clustering for applications. WLBS dynamically distributes IP traffic across multiple cluster nodes, and provides automatic failover in the event of node failure. WLBS was replaced by Network Load Balancing Services in Windows 2000.

Auto fail over is also a part in this frame.
