= Box model =

The term box model may refer to:

- Box modeling, in computer graphics
- Climate box models, in Earth sciences
- CSS box model in web development
- Gravity current box models, in fluid mechanics
- Multi-compartment model in mathematical modeling

== See also ==
- Internet Explorer box model bug, in the implementation of the CSS box model
