= Tantek Çelik =

American technologist, creator of Microformats.org

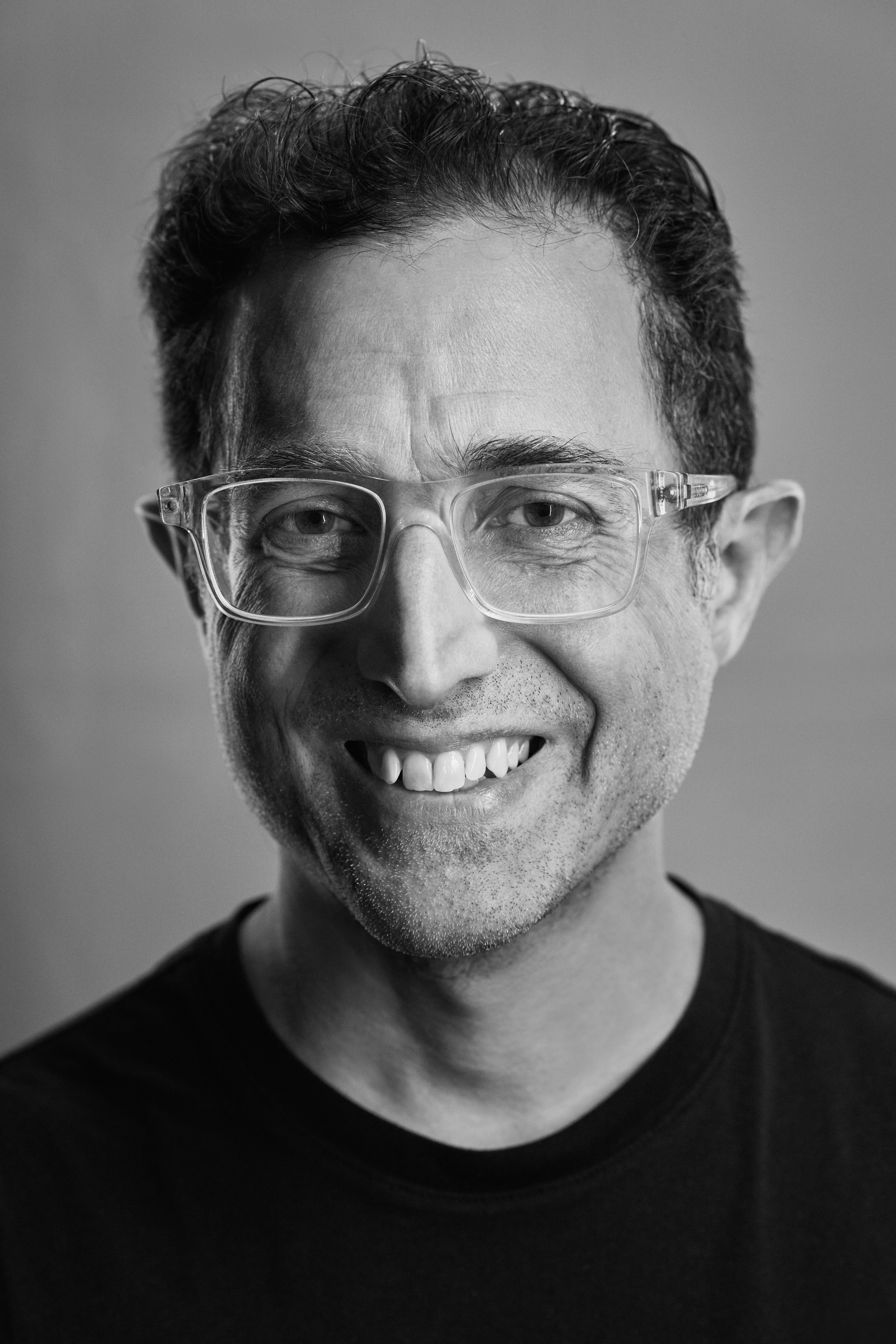
- Çelik in 2019
- Born: United States
- Education: Stanford University
- Known for: Internet Explorer for Mac; Tasman (layout engine); Box Model Hack; Reset style sheet; W3C CSS specifications; Global Multimedia Protocols Group (GMPG); XFN; microformats; IndieWebCamp
- Scientific career
- Fields: Computer science
- Workplaces: Sun Microsystems; Oracle Corporation; Apple Computer; Microsoft; microformats.org; Mozilla Corporation
- Academic advisors: Terry Winograd (masters advisor)
- Website: www.tantek.com

Tantek Çelik is a Turkish-American computer scientist, currently the Web standards lead at Mozilla Corporation. Çelik was previously the chief technologist at Technorati. He worked on microformats and is one of the principal editors of several Cascading Style Sheets (CSS) specifications. He is author of HTML5 Now: A Step-by-Step Video Tutorial for Getting Started Today (Voices That Matter) (ISBN 978-0-321-71991-1).

== Career ==
Çelik gained bachelor's and master's degrees in computer science from Stanford University. He worked at Microsoft from 1997 to 2004, where he helped lead development of the Macintosh version of Internet Explorer. Between 1998 and 2003, he managed a team of software developers that designed and implemented the Tasman rendering engine for Internet Explorer for Mac 5. During his time at Microsoft he also served as their alternate representative (1998–2000) and later their representative (2001–2004) to a number of working groups at the World Wide Web Consortium (W3C); he is credited on a number of recommendations relating to XHTML and Cascading Style Sheets due to this work. While working for Microsoft, he also developed the "box model hack" that is used by web designers to work around the Internet Explorer box model bug. and created the first reset style sheet.

Before working at Microsoft he worked in a variety of software engineer roles at Sun Microsystems, Oracle Corporation and Apple Computer. During his four years at Apple Computer (1992–1996), he spent most of his time on the OpenDoc project, first as a senior software developer and then as a technical lead. In 1996, he left Apple to form a software development and consulting company specialising in OpenDoc development, 6prime, with another OpenDoc technical lead Eric Soldan, however in 1997, Aladdin Systems purchased 6prime's main product REV releasing it as Flashback.

At Technorati, he led the adoption of better standards support (including microformats) throughout the company, including their website's front page. He was also involved with the special Election 2004 section of the website, including writing the initial version. He serves as a founder at the Global Multimedia Protocols Group.

In December 2010, Çelik began working on IndieWebCamp, an effort to coordinate a community of people to build tools to complement and eventually provide an alternative to social networking services like Twitter and Facebook.

He is the owner of the Twitter account @T.
