= Axonic Informationssysteme GmbH =

German software developer

Axonic informationssystem GmbH
- Type: Private (venture-backed)
- Industry: Email applications, Windows Search
- Founded: 2003
- Headquarters: Karlsruhe, Germany
- Key people: Martin Welker, Founder
- Website: www.axonic.com

Axonic Informationssysteme GmbH is a privately held software developer, based in Karlsruhe, Germany that develops and markets products focused on digital communication and information.

== History ==
Axonic was founded in 2003 by Martin Welker in Karlsruhe, Baden-Württemberg.

== List of products by order of release ==
Name	Release date	Notes
Chilibase	15 April 2007	Social plug-in for email clients
Lookeen	January 2008	Desktop and email search tool
GumNotes	15 September 2010	Digital sticky notes
Click.to	1 July 2011	Copy-Paste shortcut
GlamCam	18 June 2012	Camera app for iOS
Lookeen Server	21 September 2012	Enterprise search software
History of the World	1 December 2015	Illustrated children's book series
Zenkit	October 2016	Project management web app
