= Smart tag (Microsoft) =

Search feature in Microsoft software

Smart tags are an early selection-based search feature, found in later versions of Microsoft Word and beta versions of the Internet Explorer 6 web browser, by which the application recognizes certain words or types of data and converts it to a hyperlink. It is also included in other Microsoft Office programs as well as Visual Web Developer. Selection-based search allows a user to invoke an online service from any other page using only the mouse. Microsoft had initially intended the technology to be built into its Windows XP operating system but changed its plans due to public criticism.

== Overview ==
Smart tags are integrated in instances where a user might benefit from an added formatting assistance and it is part of Microsoft's control technology. It is presented as a special shortcut menu, listing options such as paste, AutoCorrect, date, Person Name, and addresses, among others that flag entered information, accordingly. Smart tags work through actions and recognizers. The latter checks whether the information entered by the user is included in the list of smart tag terms and the action associated with it is executed. It can be accessed through a dedicated smart tag button.

== Smart tags in Microsoft Word ==
Smart tags in Microsoft Office Word

With smart tags enabled, Microsoft Word attempts to recognize certain types of data in a document (for example, dates or names) and automatically makes such text a smart tag, visually indicated by a purple dotted underline. Clicking on a smart tag is the selection-based search command to bring up a list of possible actions for that data type.

As an example, in Microsoft Word the words "John Smith" would be recognized as a personal name and smart tagged. The list of actions available when clicked might be Open Contact, Schedule a Meeting, Add to Contacts, or Insert Address.

As of Word version 2010, the smart tag auto-recognition and Person Name smart tag features are no longer available.

== Smart tags in Internet Explorer 6 ==
Within a web browser, smart tag technology passes its way through a web page, underlines the words it has been pre-programmed to react to, and inserts its own hyperlinks. Selecting a smart tag, like many selection-based search commands, involved a hover followed by a mouse click. No keyboard commands are required to invoke the search. The click takes you to a destination specified by the smart tag developer, without the knowledge or permission of the web site proprietor (in early tests almost all the links offered were to sites or products of Microsoft or its affiliates).

Smart tags can also be generated by third parties; for example, a company might contract a technology firm to develop a set of smart tags and actions for their specific products or services, so that product names are automatically recognized and linked to actions such as "check quantity in stock" or "check price."

== Criticism ==
Some security vendors feared that smart tags could be used for propagating viruses, user tracking, or other data collection purposes that might violate user's privacy. Another concern was that they could be used in negative or harmful ways such as linking a political candidate's name on his own website to negative advertising on other sites.

In response to the criticism, Microsoft removed the technology from its Windows XP operating system and made it a feature that could be turned on or off in IE and in Office XP.

However, Microsoft revisited the concept of smart tags in later versions of Internet Explorer 8, which implemented a selection-based search feature called Internet Explorer 8 Accelerators. Unlike the SmartTags feature, which automatically parsed a page looking for text of interest, Accelerators relied upon the user to select the text to which the Accelerator should be applied. The Accelerators interface was open to developers, and the accelerators included by default, which use Microsoft's or its affiliates' products, could be replaced within each category with another provider if desired.

Smart tags have also been included in email and SMS text messages on Windows Phone. For example, dates in email messages are automatically recognized and when tapped, opens a window that allows an appointment to be created with the date field already filled in.

== See also ==
- Internet Explorer 8 Accelerators
- Information extraction
- Named entity recognition
