= Selection-based search =

Search engine system in which the user invokes a search query using only the mouse

A selection-based search system is a search engine system in which the user invokes a search query using only the mouse. A selection-based search system allows the user to search the internet for more information about any keyword or phrase contained within a document or webpage in any software application on their desktop computer using the mouse.

Traditional browser-based search systems require the user to launch a web browser, navigate to a search page, type or paste a query into a search box, review a list of results, and click a hyperlink to view these results. Three characteristic features of a selection-based search system are that the user can invoke search using only their mouse from within the context of any application on their desktop (for example Microsoft Office, Adobe Reader, Mozilla Firefox, etc.), receive categorized suggestions which are based on the context of the user-selected text (or in some cases the wisdom of crowds), and view the results in floating information boxes which can be sized, shared, docked, closed and stacked on top of the document that has the user's primary focus.

In its simplest form, selection-based search enables users to launch a search query by selecting text on any application on their desktop. It is commonly believed that selection-based search lowers the user barrier to search and permits an incremental number of searches per user per day. Selection-based search systems also operate on the premise that users value information in context. They may save the user from having to juggle multiple applications, multiple web browsers or use multiple search engines separately.

The term selection-based search is frequently used to classify a set of search engine systems, including a desktop client and a series of cloud computing services, but is also used to describe the paradigm of categorizing a keyword and searching multiple data sources using only the mouse. The National Information Standards Organization (NISO) uses the terms selection-based search and mouse-based search interchangeably to describe this web search paradigm.

== Operation ==
No two selection-based search systems are alike. Some simply provide a list of links in a context menu to other websites, such as the proposed Internet Explorer 8 Accelerators feature. Others only allow the user to search their desktop files such as Macintosh Spotlight, or to search a popular search engine such as Google or Yahoo!, while others only search lesser-known search engines, newsgroups, and more specialized databases. Selection-based search systems also differ in how the results are presented and the quality of semantic categorization which is used. Some will open links to content in a new browser window. Others return content in floating information boxes which can be sized, shared, docked, etc.

A key challenge for selection-based search is that a long or nested list of categories quickly becomes unwieldy for the user. Therefore, it is incumbent upon the selection-based search system to both categorize the user-selected text and to identify those online services which most naturally apply to the selected text. For example, when the user selects an address, the system needs to identify the address as most suitable for an online mapping service such as Google Maps. When the user selects a movie title, the system needs to identify the selection as suitable for a movie database such as Internet Movie Database. When the user selects the name of a company, the system needs to identify the concordant stock symbol and an appropriate financial database such as Yahoo! Finance.

== Quality of results ==
Usability can vary widely between selection-based search systems relying on a large number of variables. Even the most basic selection-based search systems will allow more of the web to be searched by the user in the context of their work than any one stand-alone search engine. On the other hand, the process is sometimes said to be redundant if the system applies no intelligence to categorizing the selected text and matching it to an online service, and simply provides a link for the user to their preferred search engine(s).

== See also ==
For cloud computing services used by selection-based search systems, see the list of search engines

- Accelerator in Internet Explorer 8
- Microsoft Smart Tags
- Yahoo! Search selection-based search
- Macintosh Spotlight
