= Click.to =

click.to is application software that integrates with the operating system clipboard to enhance copy and paste operations. It analyzes data stored on the clipboard and offers the user a choice of appropriate paste-destination programs or web pages from a context menu. click.to is a product of Axonic Informationssysteme GmbH, headquartered in Karlsruhe, Germany.

== Extensions ==
Users and developers may customize functions and add search queries either through an embedded form or by the use of the click.to API.

== System requirements ==
The following operating systems support click.to:

Apple:
- Mac OS X v10.6 Snow Leopard
- Mac OS X v10.7 Lion (64-bit)
Microsoft:
- Windows XP
- Windows Vista (32- and 64-bit)
- Windows 7 (32- and 64-bit)

== Competitors ==
click.to has functionality similar to "accelerators" that can be installed as a browser extension for Internet Explorer. These also provide a context menu with speed-dial functions but run only within the browser (whereas click.to is fully integrated into the computer's operating system).
