= Layout (computing) =

In computing, layout is the process of calculating the position of objects in space subject to various constraints. This functionality can be part of an application or packaged as a reusable component or library.

== Examples ==
- Page layout is the computation of the position of the paragraphs, tabs, sentences, words and letters of a text. This is done by desktop publishing software, typesetting software, and web browsers. These programs typically have dedicated layout routines to calculate the correct position of glyphs and embedded images.
- Some widget toolkits include a layout manager. This component automatically calculates a widget's position based on alignment constraints without the need for the programmer to specify absolute coordinates.
- Graph drawing software automatically determine the position of the vertexes and edges of a graph with various goals like minimization of the number of edge intersections, minimization of total area or production of an aesthetically pleasing result.
- Electronic design automation tools for the place and route step.

== See also ==
- CSS box model
- Document layout analysis
- Layout engine (disambiguation)
