= Global Multimedia Protocols Group =

The Global Multimedia Protocols Group (GMPG) was founded in March 2003 by Tantek Çelik, Eric A. Meyer, and Matt Mullenweg. The group has developed methods to represent human relationships using XHTML called XHTML Friends Network (XFN) and XHTML Meta Data Profiles (XMDP), for use in weblogs.

GMPG was founded to develop the initial principles for XFN, the XHTML Friends Network as an attempt for the creation of a simple way to express human relationships on the Web within HTML (machine-readable).

As of 2015, an analysis of the network of pages collected by Common Crawl found that the web host gmpg.org had the highest PageRank and third highest in-degree of all the hosts in the network.

The name of the group was taken from the 1992 cyberpunk novel Snow Crash.

== See also ==
- Microformats
