= Layout engine =

Layout engine may refer to:

- Browser engine, a software component of a web browser that does the layout of web pages
- Digital typesetting software, used both during document creation and consumption
- Layout manager, a software component in a GUI toolkit that dynamically lays out widgets based on a combination of system constraints from the device, user, and author(s)
