= Internet Explorer for Mac =

Web browser for Apple computers developed by Microsoft

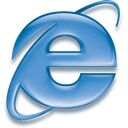

- Internet Explorer 5.2.3 for Mac OS X, showing its Easter egg
- Developer: Microsoft
- Release: April 23, 1996; 30 years ago
- Final release: 5.2.3 / 16 June 2003
- Operating system: System 7.01 to Mac OS X 10.3.9; Unofficially, to Mac OS X 10.6.8
- Platform: 68k (up to 4.01), PowerPC (up to 5.2.3)
- Successor: Safari
- Type: Web browser
- License: Freeware, bundled software
- Website: microsoft.com/mac at the Wayback Machine (archived 2003-08-06)

Internet Explorer for Mac (also referred to as Internet Explorer for Macintosh, Internet Explorer Macintosh Edition, Internet Explorer:mac or IE:mac) is a discontinued proprietary web browser developed by Microsoft for the Macintosh platform to browse web pages. Initial versions were developed from the same code base as Internet Explorer for Windows. Later versions diverged, particularly with the release of version 5, which included the fault-tolerant and highly standards-compliant Tasman layout engine.

As a result of the five-year agreement between Apple and Microsoft in 1997, it was the default browser on the classic Mac OS and Mac OS X from 1998 until it was superseded by Apple's own Safari web browser in 2003 with the release of Mac OS X Panther (10.3).

On June 13, 2003, Microsoft announced that it was ceasing further development of Internet Explorer for Mac, and the final update was released on July 11, 2003. The browser was not included in the default installation of Mac OS X Tiger (10.4), which was released on April 29, 2005. Microsoft discontinued releases of the product on December 31, 2005, and removed the application from its Macintosh downloads site on January 31, 2006. Microsoft recommended "that users migrate to more recent web browsing technologies such as Apple's Safari." A Microsoft browser would not return to the macOS platform until Microsoft Edge in 2019.

== History ==
Versions of Internet Explorer for Macintosh were released from version 2 in 1996 to version 5, which received its last patch in 2003. IE versions for Mac typically lagged Windows versions by several months to a year, but included some unique features, including its own layout engine, called Tasman.

=== Internet Explorer 2.0 for Macintosh ===
The first version of Internet Explorer for the Macintosh operating system was a beta version of Internet Explorer 2.0 for Macintosh, released on January 23, 1996, as a free download from Microsoft's website. This first version was based on the Spyglass Mosaic web browser licensed from Spyglass. Available for both 68k and PPC based Macs running System 7.0.1 or later, it supported the embedding of several multimedia formats into web pages, including AVI and QuickTime formatted video and AIFF and WAV formatted audio. The final version was released three months later on April 23. Version 2.1, released in August of the same year, was mostly aimed at fixing bugs and improving stability, but also added a few features, such as support for the NPAPI (the first version of Internet Explorer on any platform to do so) and support for QuickTime VR. AOL 3.0 for Macintosh used the IE 2.1 rendering engine in its built-in web browser.

=== Internet Explorer 3.0 for Macintosh ===
On November 5, 1996, Microsoft announced the release of a beta version of Internet Explorer version 3.0 for Macintosh. This release added support for HTML version 3.2, Cascading Style Sheets, Java applets and ActiveX controls. The final version, made available on January 8, 1997, also added support for the SSL and NTLM security protocols and the PICS and RSACi rating systems that can be used to control access to websites based on content ratings. A problem with an operating system extension used in the Mac OS, called CFM68K Runtime Enabler, led to a delay in the release of version 3.0 for Macs based on the 68k line of processors. Four months later, on May 14, Microsoft released version 3.01, which included a version for 68k-based machines. This version also included features from the Windows version of Internet Explorer 4.0, such as AutoComplete and Monitoring Favorites that notified users when sites in their Favorites list have been updated. It also included support for JavaScript and introduced a Download Manager and a Cookie Manager.

=== Internet Explorer 4.0 for Macintosh ===
At the 1997 Macworld Expo in Boston, on August 6, Steve Jobs and Bill Gates announced a partnership between Microsoft and Apple. Amongst other things, Apple agreed to make Internet Explorer the default browser instead of Netscape Navigator.

Five months later, on January 6, 1998, at the Macworld Expo in San Francisco, Microsoft announced the release of the final version of Internet Explorer version 4.0 for Macintosh. Version 4 included support for offline browsing, Dynamic HTML, a new, faster Java virtual machine, and Security Zones that allow users or administrators to limit access to certain types of web content depending on which zone (for example, Intranet or Internet) the content was coming from. The most publicized feature of Internet Explorer 4.0 was support for Microsoft's Active Channel technology, intended to deliver regularly updated content that users could tailor to their interests. However, Active Channel failed to reach a wide audience.

At the same event, Apple announced the release of Mac OS 8.1. This was the first version of the Macintosh operating system to bundle Internet Explorer as its default browser per the agreement with Microsoft; however, version 4.0 was not ready in time to be included, so version 3.01 was bundled on the CDs.

At the following year's San Francisco Macworld Expo on January 9, 1999, Microsoft announced the release of Internet Explorer 4.5 Macintosh Edition. This new version, which dropped 68K processor support, introduced Form AutoFill, Print Preview, the Page Holder pane, which let a user hold a page of links on one side of the screen that opened pages in the right hand, and support for Mac OS technology like Sherlock.

=== Internet Explorer 5 Macintosh Edition ===
Another year later, on January 5, 2000, Microsoft announced a new version of Internet Explorer at the San Francisco Macworld Expo, Internet Explorer 5 Macintosh Edition which was released two months later on March 27, 2000. The Windows version of Internet Explorer 5 had been released a year earlier, but used the Trident layout engine. The Macintosh Edition introduced a new rendering engine called Tasman that was designed to be more compliant with emerging W3C standards such as HTML 4.0, CSS Level 1, DOM Level 1, and ECMAScript. It also introduced several features that were later added to other browsers, such as complete support for the PNG image standard (which previous versions did not support at all), DOCTYPE switching, Text Zoom, and XML source view. It also included an Auction Manager for tracking auctions on sites like eBay and an Internet Scrapbook to allow users to quickly and easily store and organize web content (for example, an image or a selected piece of text). Preview releases of the browser included a feature called the MediaBar, which integrated MP3 and internet radio playback, but this feature was dropped from the final version. The initial release was just for Mac OS 8 and Mac OS 9; however, two months after that release, on May 15, a Mac OS X version was released, bundled with the Mac OS X DP4 release handed out to developers at the 2000 Worldwide Developers Conference. The Mac OS X Public Beta included another preview of the Mac OS X version of IE. The release of Mac OS X 10.0 on March 24, 2001, included yet another preview of the Mac OS X version of IE 5. This was updated later, and the release of Mac OS X 10.1 on September 25, 2001, included the final version of Internet Explorer 5.1 for Mac OS X. IE 5.1 for Mac OS 8 and 9 was released on December 18, 2001.

According to Jorg Brown, one of the IE for Mac developers at Microsoft, after version 5, most of the team that produced IE for Mac was moved to another project. IE for Mac was relegated to something they were expected to work on in their "spare time".

On June 17, 2002, Microsoft announced the release of version 5.2 (the first Mac OS X-only release), which included a few performance and security fixes and support for Mac OS X features, such as Quartz text smoothing.

In 2002, Microsoft reassigned developers to develop version 6 of Internet Explorer for Mac, intended as the basis for a new product. MSN for Mac OS X would be a subscription-only browser that worked with the online MSN service, incorporating features like an address book, junk mail filters, and an MSN Messenger client. However, after hearing that Apple had begun developing its own browser, it canceled standalone browser development and focused on the MSN browser, which was released on May 15, 2003.

On June 13, 2003, PC Pro reported that Macintosh Business Unit general manager Roz Ho had confirmed that aside from updates to fix security problems, there would be no new versions of Internet Explorer from Microsoft. Three days later, on June 16, 2003, Microsoft released the final version for Mac OS X (PPC), version 5.2.3, and a month later, on July 11, 2003, they released the final version for Mac OS 8 and 9, version 5.1.7. The last versions of Internet Explorer for Mac OS X (PPC) had a distinctive blue logo that served as the basis for the logo used in Internet Explorer 6 for Windows (the Windows one was lighter blue and less three-dimensional).

==== Distinguishing features ====
These features are found in Internet Explorer for Mac but not in common contemporary browsers (with the possible exception of Internet Explorer for Windows). Some are still not featured in many browsers.

- Support for annotative glosses to Japanese kanji and Chinese characters (see furigana).
- Scrapbook feature lets the user archive any page in its current state.
- Auction Manager feature automatically tracks eBay auctions.
- Although Internet Explorer for Mac did not have any PNG support at all until version 5.0 (a year or two after other major browsers), the PNG support added in that version was unusually robust, including transparency and color correction.
- Support for matching web page colors using ColorSync.
- An option to change the browser color to match the colors of the iMac G3. The first builds offered 9 colors, but later builds offered 15.
- The URL auto-complete window in the pre-Carbon versions was translucent and blurred the content behind to maintain readability of the suggested completions. This is the first time an app has had a blurred, translucent window and an effect similar to iOS 7's look, years after iOS 7. The later Carbon versions just used Mac OS X built-in window translucency without blurring.
- Print Preview functionality allowing for adjustment of the font size from within the preview pane.
- Page Holder sidebar functionality allowing users to hold a rendered page in the sidebar (a links-only view was available too) and load clicked links in the main browser window. Much of this functionality was replaced with tabbed browsing in later browsers, but not the links-only view.
- As with previous IE Mac versions, and in common with many other Macintosh internet software, the URL from which content was downloaded is added to the Finder's Comment field (visible through Get Info).
- Support for the Internet Config system. Macintosh versions of Internet Explorer were characterized by strong support for Mac-only technologies, often to a greater extent than Netscape Navigator.

==== Other features ====
These features are found in Internet Explorer for Mac and in some other contemporaries.

- Auto-complete in the address bar responds to typing partial URLs or page titles, searches favorites and history
- The Go menu allows access to the persistent global browser history
- Tasman rendering engine offers superior CSS support compared to Trident in other Internet Explorer 5 versions, and was not affected by the Internet Explorer box model bug (not fixed in Trident until IE 6)
- Text zoom allows the user to resize text on any page, regardless of how text size is specified

==== Easter egg ====
Acid1 is included as an offline Easter egg, accessible by typing 'about:tasman', in Internet Explorer 5 for Mac OS with the text replaced by the names of the developers.

== Version summary ==
Internet Explorer for Mac version overview
Mac OS 7, 8, 9 on 68k and PPC
| Version | Date | Notes | Layout engine |
| Version 2.0 | April 23, 1996 | | |
| Version 2.1 | August 1996 | | |
| Version 3.0 | January 8, 1997 | PPC only initially; 128-bit SGC encryption | |
| Version 3.01 | May 14, 1997 | Included with Mac OS 8; download manager | |
| Version 4.0 | January 6, 1998 | Included with Mac OS 8, final version for Mac OS 7, 8 (68k) | |
| Version 4.5 | January 5, 1999 | | |
| Version 5.0 | March 27, 2000 | | Tasman v0 |
| Version 5.1 | December 18, 2001 | | Tasman v0.1 |
| Version 5.1.4 | April 16, 2002 | | Tasman |
| Version 5.1.5 | July 5, 2002 | | Tasman |
| Version 5.1.6 | September 25, 2002 | | Tasman |
| Version 5.1.7 | July 11, 2003 | final version for Mac OS 8, 9 (PPC) | Tasman |
Mac OS X on PPC
| Version | Date | Notes | Layout engine |
| Version 5 | May 15, 2000 | released with Mac OS X DP4 | Tasman v0 |
| Version 5.1.1 | May 23, 2001 | | Tasman v0.1 |
| Version 5.1.2 | September 25, 2001 | released with Mac OS X 10.1 | Tasman |
| Version 5.1.3 | October 23, 2001 | released in Microsoft Security Bulletin MS01-053 | Tasman |
| Version 5.2 | June 17, 2002 | | Tasman |
| Version 5.2.1 | July 5, 2002 | | Tasman |
| Version 5.2.2 | September 25, 2002 | | Tasman |
| Version 5.2.3 | June 16, 2003 | final version for Mac OS X (PPC) | Tasman v0.9 |

== See also ==
- Microsoft Edge for macOS
- Internet Explorer
- List of web browsers
- Comparison of web browsers
- Browser timeline
