= Internet Explorer 8 =

Web browser for Windows released in 2009

- Screenshot of Internet Explorer 8
- Developer: Microsoft
- Release: March 19, 2009; 17 years ago
- Stable release: Service Pack 1 (8.00.7601.17514) / February 22, 2011; 15 years ago
- Engine: MSHTML 4.0
- Operating system: Windows XP SP2 or later; Windows XP x64 Edition SP2; Windows Server 2003 SP2; Windows Vista; Windows Server 2008
- Platform: cf. § system requirements
- Included with: Windows 7 Windows Server 2008 R2
- Predecessor: Internet Explorer 7 (2006)
- Successor: Internet Explorer 9 (2011)
- Type: Web browser Aggregator; FTP client
- License: Proprietary, requires Windows license
- Website: Internet Explorer 8 (archived at Wayback Machine)

Windows Internet Explorer 8 (IE8) is a major version of the Internet Explorer web browser for Windows released by Microsoft on March 19, 2009 and is the successor to Internet Explorer 7. It was the default browser on Windows 7 and Windows Server 2008 R2.

It is the first version of Internet Explorer to pass the Acid2 test, the last of the major browsers to do so, though In the later Acid3 Test, it scores 24/100. It is also the first version of Internet Explorer to include web development tools, as previous versions of Internet Explorer never had tools to develop websites. Additionally, it is the first version of Internet Explorer to feature a Compatibility View mode to optionally emulate older versions' rendering behavior, and has color-coded tab groups where links opened in new tabs share the color of the website they originated from. According to Microsoft, security, ease of use, and improvements in RSS, CSS, and Ajax support were its priorities for IE8.

It is the last version of Internet Explorer to run on Windows XP SP2+, Windows XP x64 Edition SP2, Windows Server 2003 SP2, Windows Vista RTM through SP1 and Windows Server 2008 RTM. It is the final Itanium version of Internet Explorer as well, although it is only available as pre-installed in the Itanium edition of Windows Server 2008 R2. The Itanium version does not support versions earlier than Windows Server 2008 R2. In addition, it is the last version of Internet Explorer supporting processors without PAE or SSE2.

== History ==
=== Development ===
Browser's wordmark

Internet Explorer 8 development started in or before March 2006. In February 2008, Microsoft sent out private invitations for IE8 Beta 1, and on March 5, 2008, released Beta 1 to the general public, although with a focus on web developers. The release launched with an Internet Explorer 8 Readiness Toolkit website promoting IE8 white papers, related software tools, and new features in addition to download links to the Beta. Microsoft Developer Network (MSDN) added new sections detailing new IE8 technology. Major press focused on a controversy about Version Targeting, and two new features then called WebSlice and Activities. The readiness toolkit was promoted as something "developers can exploit to make Internet Explorer 8 'light up'."

On August 27, 2008, Microsoft made IE8 Beta 2 generally available. PC World noted various Beta 2 features such as InPrivate mode, tab isolation and color-coding, and improved standards and compatibility compared to Internet Explorer 7. Two name changes included Activities to Accelerators, and the IE7 Phishing filter renamed Safety Filter in the first Beta to SmartScreen, both accompanied by incremental technical changes as well. By August 2008, the new feature called InPrivate had taken the spotlight.

On January 5, 2009, a tool was provided by Microsoft to block the automatic install of Internet Explorer 8 via Windows Update.

IE8 reached general availability on March 19, 2009. A version optimized for Bing and MSN was also available.

=== Language support ===
Language support (localization) was not complete on release. Internet Explorer 8 was released with 25 languages. This grew up to 63 for 32-bit in June 2009. Support for additional languages can come pre-installed based on the OS, or downloaded and installed via Multilingual User Interface (MUI) packages.

=== Release history ===
Internet Explorer 8 release history
| Version | | Release date | Windows XP / Windows Server 2003 | Windows Vista / Windows Server 2008 | Windows 7 / Windows Server 2008 R2 | Languages |
| Name | Number | Release date | Windows XP / Windows Server 2003 | Windows Vista / Windows Server 2008 | Windows 7 / Windows Server 2008 R2 | Languages |
|---|---|---|---|---|---|---|
| Beta 1 | 8.0.6001.17184 | March 5, 2008 | Yes | Yes | No | 3 |
| Beta 2 | 8.0.6001.18241 | August 27, 2008 | Yes | Yes | Yes | 25 |
| Partner Build (Pre RC) | 8.0.6001.18343 | December 10, 2008 | Yes | Yes | Yes | 1 |
| Release Candidate | 8.0.6001.18372 | January 26, 2009 | Yes | Yes | Yes | 25 |
| Final Release | 8.0.6001.18702 | March 19, 2009 | Yes | Yes | Included | 25–63^{*} |
| Service Pack 1 | 8.0.7601.17514 | February 9, 2011 | No | No | Included | 25–63^{*} |

* Initially, Internet Explorer supported 25 languages; additional languages, for a total of 63 were released by June 2009, but not all languages are available on all Windows versions.

=== End of life ===
Support for IE8 on Windows XP ended with its end of extended support on April 8, 2014 with no upgrades to more recent versions, as it can't run IE9 and higher officially, making IE8 the final version of Internet Explorer which could run on this version. Support for IE8 on later versions ended on January 12, 2016, when Microsoft began requiring customers to use the latest version of Internet Explorer available for each Windows version. On October 13, 2020, Microsoft released the final IE8 update for Windows Embedded Standard 7, marking the end of IE8 support on all platforms.

== New features ==
Quick Tabs on Internet Explorer 8

Internet Explorer 8 contains many new features, including Web Slices and Accelerators, and is the first version of Internet Explorer to include web development tools to help design and debug webpages. Visible changes of the user interface are that the tabs have an inward, softer color gradient instead of the outward, more glossy and vibrant gradient of Internet Explorer 7, and a redesigned Favorites Bar has been added, replacing the Links bar of Internet Explorer 7.

=== Accelerators ===
A map Accelerator using the IE8 Accelerators Smart tag

Accelerators are a form of selection-based search and browser extension which allow a user to invoke an online service from any other page using only the mouse. Microsoft introduced accelerators in Internet Explorer 8 Beta 1 as "activities". It was later renamed to "accelerators" in IE 8 Beta 2. Actions such as selecting the text or other objects will give users access to the usable Accelerator services (such as blogging with the selected text, or viewing a map of a selected geographical location), which can then be invoked with the selected object.

According to Microsoft, Accelerators eliminate the need to copy and paste content between web pages. IE8 specifies an XML-based encoding which allows a web application or web service to be invoked as an Accelerator service. How the service will be invoked and for what categories of content it will show up are specified in the XML file. Similarities have been drawn between Accelerators and the controversial Smart tags feature experimented with in the IE6 Beta but withdrawn after criticism (though later included in MS Office).

Support for Accelerators was removed in Microsoft Edge, the successor to Internet Explorer.

=== Autocomplete changes ===
The address bar features domain highlighting for added security so that the top-level domain is shown in black whereas the other parts of the URL are grayed out. Domain highlighting cannot be turned off by users or web sites. Other features of the address bar include support for pasting multi-line URLs and an improved model for inserting the selection caret, and selecting words, or entire URLs in the Address bar. The inline autocomplete feature has been dropped from Internet Explorer 8, leading to criticism by beta users.

=== Automatic tab-crash recovery ===
If a website or add-on causes a tab to crash in Internet Explorer 8, only that tab is affected. The browser itself remains stable and other tabs remain unaffected, thereby minimizing any disruption to the browsing experience. If a tab unexpectedly closes or crashes it is automatically reloaded with the same content as before the crash.

=== Developer tools ===
Internet Explorer 8's developer tools in a JavaScript profiling session

Internet Explorer 8 is the first version of Internet Explorer to include web development tools, as previous versions only displayed the raw HTML to edit using Notepad. The new developer tools interface includes new tools, such as an HTML element inspector to select HTML elements in the Document Object Model (DOM), displaying and editing CSS style sheets of a webpage, programming, debugging, and running JavaScript and VBScript code, testing the webpage in different browser versions such as IE7, and can modify webpages in real-time. The developer tools interface consists of 4 sections: HTML, CSS, Script, and Profiler.

The HTML section displays the Document Object Model (DOM) of a webpage as a tree view with indentation, elements in the tree view can expand and contract child elements, and any selected element in the DOM displays the applied CSS styles to the selected element. The CSS section lists all of the style sheet files used on a webpage at once, in a tree view, and the style sheet files displays their properties within the style sheet.

The Script section provides a debugger and editor for JavaScript and VBScript code. Clicking on the "Start Debugging" button allows live debugging of on-the-fly JS and VBS debugging, typing on the console will execute the code in real-time, and enabling "Multi Line Mode" allows users to edit multiple lines of code without it executing automatically. The Profiler section provides data about JavaScript performance, method latency, and can profile the performance of JavaScript and VBScript code in the webpage. Clicking on the "Start Profiling" button will start profiling in real time, and displays the processes in multiple sortable views, and it can save profiling sessions to a .csv table file.

=== Favorites Bar ===
Another new feature in IE8 is the redesigned Favorites Bar, which can now host content such as Web Slices, web feeds, and documents, in addition to website links and folders.

=== Inline search within pages ===
Internet Explorer 8 replaces the Find... dialog box with an inline Find toolbar which can be activated by pressing Ctrl+F or from search box drop-down menu but the F3 (or any other kind of a keyboard-driven) NextFind command has gone. Internet Explorer 8 highlights all instances of found words while allowing the user to continue the navigation normally.

=== InPrivate ===
A new security mode called InPrivate debuted with IE8, and consists of two main features: InPrivate Browsing and InPrivate Filtering. InPrivate Browsing has been described as a "porn mode" in various news outlets. A similar feature, first introduced in Safari in 2005, was later implemented in Firefox 3.5, Opera 10.5, and Google Chrome.

When a user uses InPrivate Browsing in Internet Explorer 8, one's browsing history, temporary Internet files, form data, cookies, and usernames and passwords are not retained by the browser, leaving no local evidence of browsing or search history.

InPrivate Filtering provides users an added level of control and choice about the information that third party websites can use to track browsing activity. InPrivate Subscriptions allow users to augment the capability of InPrivate Blocking by subscribing to lists of websites to block or allow.

As without InPrivate mode, information about a browsing session can be recovered on unexpected software closes.

=== Performance and stability ===
The architecture of IE8

Internet Explorer 8 includes performance improvements across the HTML parser, CSS engine, mark-up tree manipulation as well as the JScript runtime and the associated garbage collector. Memory leaks due to inconsistent handling of circular references between JScript objects and DOM objects were corrected. For better security and stability, IE8 uses the Loosely Coupled Internet Explorer (LCIE) architecture and runs the browser frame and tabs in separate processes. LCIE prevents glitches and hangs from bringing down the entire browser and leads to higher performance and scalability. Permissions for ActiveX controls have been made more flexible – instead of enabling or disabling them globally, they can now be allowed on a per-site basis.

=== SmartScreen Filter ===
SmartScreen Filter extended Internet Explorer 7's phishing filter to include protection from socially engineered malware. Every website and download is checked against a local list of popular legitimate websites; if the site is not listed, the entire address is sent to Microsoft for further checks. If it has been labeled as an impostor or harmful, Internet Explorer 8 will show a screen prompting that the site is reported harmful and shouldn't be visited. From there the user can either visit his or her homepage, visit the previous site, or continue to the unsafe page. If a user attempts to download a file from a location reported harmful, then the download is cancelled. The effectiveness of SmartScreen filtering has been reported to be superior to socially engineered malware protection in other browsers.

This feature can be disabled or enforced using Group Policy.

=== Suggested sites ===
This feature is described by Microsoft as a tool to suggest websites, which is done by the browser sending information to Microsoft over a secure connection, which keeps the information and a per-session, uniquely generated identifier for a short time. The Suggested Sites feature is turned off by default and is disabled when the user is browsing with InPrivate enabled or visiting SSL-secured, intranet, IP address, or IDN address sites. Information that could be personally identifiable, such as the user's IP address and browser information is sent to Microsoft as an artifact of the HTTPS protocol. Microsoft has stated that they do not store this information.

The functionality was defended by Microsoft after itworld.com's Gregg Keizer described it as a "phone home" feature.

=== Web Slices and authenticated feeds ===
IE8 Favorites menu displaying a Web Slice in a flyout Window

Web Slices are snippets of a full webpage to which a user can subscribe. Web Slices are kept updated by the browser automatically, and can be viewed directly from the Favorites bar, complete with graphics and visuals. Developers can mark parts of the pages as Web Slices, using the hAtom and hSlice microformats. Web Slices have been compared to Active Desktop, introduced in Internet Explorer 4 in 1997.

Microsoft donated the specification to the public domain under the Creative Commons Public Domain Dedication. It is also covered by the Microsoft Open Specification Promise.

Windows RSS Platform also supports authenticated feeds beginning with Internet Explorer 8.

=== Zooming and image scaling ===
Full-page zoom now reflows the text to remove the appearance of horizontal scrollbars on zooming. Image scaling is done using bicubic interpolation resulting in smoother looking images when scaled.

Using the Compatibility View mode will cause style issues with <select> form elements when changing zoom levels.

=== ActiveX behavior control ===
The information bar lets users allow an ActiveX control to run on all Web sites or only the current one. Users can easily make changes to this behavior through the Manage Add-ons dialog box. For each ActiveX control, there's a list of sites where it has been approved by the user.

== Removed features ==
- It is no longer possible to have Internet Explorer automatically open the current session at the next startup. Previous sessions can still be restored manually.
- Address Bar inline AutoComplete has been removed.
- CSS Expressions are no longer supported in Internet Explorer 8 Standards mode.
- Web folders can only be opened through the drive mapping tools.
- Support for the proprietary <wbr> element is dropped.
- The option to delete files and settings stored by addons or ActiveX controls is removed, as it is now performed automatically.
- Web page links and images can be dragged only to the desktop or to an open Explorer window.

== Standards support ==
=== Standards mode ===
Internet Explorer 8's main rendering mode, known as standards mode, improved support for various web standards, especially CSS, compared to Internet Explorer 7 and earlier versions.

The web standards supported by IE8 include the following:

- Accessible Rich Internet Applications specification for enhanced accessibility in Ajax-based rich Internet applications.
- CSS level 1 is fully supported. CSS level 2 is mostly supported; however, several rendering bugs and regressions may affect conformance. CSS level 3 is partially supported.
- Data: URIs (limited to non-navigable content less than 32 KiB)
- DOM, which brings it in line with implementations in other browsers. Attributes and properties in DOM objects are now handled differently, and the behavior of the getAttribute, setAttribute, and removeAttribute modifiers have been changed to match the behavior of other browsers.
- DOM storage
- HTML, including the HTML object fallback and the abbr and elements
- Partial HTML 5 support, including cross-document messaging
- Selectors APIs

However, IE8 does not support some other W3C standards:

Internet Explorer's failure (24/100) of the Acid3 rendering test

- MathML
- Significant parts of DOM Level 2 and 3, including the standard event model used by other browsers.
- Scalable Vector Graphics. The lack of SVG support in IE8 was criticized by World Wide Web inventor Tim Berners-Lee.
- XHTML (except when used as a form of HTML)

IE8 passes the Acid2 test, but fails the Acid3 test with a score of 24/100. During its development, Microsoft developed over 7,000 tests for CSS level 2 compliance, which were submitted to the W3C for inclusion in their test suite.

=== Compatibility View mode ===
Internet Explorer 8 was promoted by Microsoft as having stricter adherence to W3C described web standards than Internet Explorer 7. As a result, as in every IE version before it, some percentage of web pages coded to the behavior of the older versions would break in IE8. This would have been a repetition of the situation with IE7 which, while having fixed bugs from IE6, broke pages that used the IE6-specific hacks to work around its non-compliance. This was especially a problem for offline HTML documents, which may not be updatable (e.g., stored on a read-only medium, such as a CD-ROM or DVD-ROM).

To avoid this situation, IE8 implements a form of Version Targeting whereby a page could be authored to a specific version of a browser using the X-UA-Compatible declaration either as a meta element or in the HTTP headers.

To maintain backwards compatibility, sites can opt-into IE7-like handling of content by inserting a specially created meta element into the web page that triggers the "Compatibility View" mode in the browser, using:

<meta http-equiv="X-UA-Compatible" content="IE=EmulateIE7" />

== Adoption ==
Five weeks after the release of IE8 Beta 2 in August 2008, Beta 1's market share had grown from 0.05 percent to 0.61 percent, according to Net Applications. In July 2009, just under four months after the final release, the market share jumped to 13 percent.

As of September 2013, estimates of IE8's global market share ranged from 6.93% to 8.73%.

According to a Net Applications web analytics report from October 2014, Internet Explorer 8 accounted for 17.31% of web traffic, now overtaken by IE11 in usage.

== Reviews and reception ==
In a March 19, 2009, review, Benny Har-Even of IT PRO offered some praise of Internet Explorer 8, noting its reliability and good features and concluding that it was "certainly the best version of Internet Explorer in a long time," but also that "there's not yet anything here to make Firefox users want to jump ship." He offered praise to Microsoft for paying attention to their competition and producing "a better featured, faster and more reliable browsing experience for the masses" and suggested that as Microsoft continues to improve the product, it would become "harder to persuade the unconverted to switch away from IE."

The next month, on April 2, Mark Joseph Edwards wrote in the newsletter Windows Secrets that the new edition of Internet Explorer had greatly improved security, speed, and compatibility, but opined that it still lagged behind competitors in all three areas. Edwards noted that, at the time, Internet Explorer 8 was still underperforming relative to other browsers in speed and was not as successful in displaying webpages as they were intended to display as such browsers as Firefox and Opera. In terms of security, he wrote that its "continued reliance on ActiveX makes the browser vulnerable in its very foundation." For these reasons, he suggested that Firefox remained a better alternative to Internet Explorer 8, even though it was a "much better browser than IE 7."

Around 2010, a theme named "BlueSky" was created for the Mozilla Firefox browser with the aim to resemble the graphical user interface of Internet Explorer 8 as accurately as possible.

== System requirements ==
Versions and configurations of Windows supported by IE8
| Operating system | Service pack needed | CPU architecture | Minimum RAM |
|---|---|---|---|
| Windows XP | SP2 or later | IA-32 | 64 MB |
| Windows XP x64 Edition | SP2 only | x64 | 128 MB |
| Windows Server 2003 | SP2 only | IA-32 and x64 | 64 MB on IA-32, 128 MB on x64 |
| Windows Vista | RTM or later | IA-32 and x64 | 512 MB |
| Windows Server 2008 | RTM or later | IA-32 and x64 | 512 MB |
| Windows 7 | RTM or later | IA-32 and x64 | 1 GB |
| Windows Server 2008 R2 | RTM or later | x64 and Itanium | 1 GB |

== See also ==
- Comparison of web browsers
- Mandatory Integrity Control

| Preceded by Internet Explorer 7 | Internet Explorer 8; 2009 | Succeeded by Internet Explorer 9 |
