= CSS hack =

Coding technique

A CSS hack is a coding technique used to hide or show CSS markup depending on the browser, version number, or capabilities. Browsers have different interpretations of CSS behavior and different levels of support for the W3C standards. CSS hacks are sometimes used to achieve consistent layout appearance in multiple browsers that do not have compatible rendering. Most of these hacks do not work in modern versions of the browsers, and other techniques, such as feature support detection, have become more prevalent.

== Types of hacks ==
=== Invalid or non-compliant CSS ===
Due to quirks in the interpretation of CSS by various browsers, most CSS hacks involve writing invalid CSS rules that are interpreted only by specific browsers, or relying on bugs in specific browsers. An example of this is prefixing rules with an underscore (as in _width) to target Internet Explorer 6—other browsers will ignore the line, allowing it to be used to write code specific to one browser.

Similar CSS hacks involve inducing syntax errors like asterisks, missing whitespace, and CSS comments around property names. Additionally, in Internet Explorer 6 and 7, the !important declaration is recognized as such with any string after the exclamation mark, e.g. !ie.

=== Unsupported CSS ===
Although newer CSS rules are correct by current standards, they are ignored by older browsers as "invalid". By writing old rules followed by newer rules that cancel out or modify the old ones, it is possible to only activate certain rules on older browsers.

=== Conditional comments ===
Prior to version 10, Internet Explorer supported a special comment syntax that would allow blocks of HTML to be read only by specific versions of the browser. These comments are mostly used to provide specific CSS and JavaScript workarounds to older versions of the browser. No other browsers interpreted these comments or offered similar functionality.

The following are examples of the different syntax for these comments.

<head>
  <title>Test</title>
  <link href="all_browsers.css" rel="stylesheet" type="text/css">
  <!--[if IE]> <link href="ie_only.css" rel="stylesheet" type="text/css"> <![endif]-->
  <!--[if lt IE 7]> <link href="ie_6_and_below.css" rel="stylesheet" type="text/css"> <![endif]-->
  <!--[if !lt IE 7]> <![IGNORE[--><![IGNORE[]]> <link href="recent.css" rel="stylesheet" type="text/css"> <!--<![endif]-->
   <link href="not_ie.css" rel="stylesheet" type="text/css"> <!--<![endif]-->
</head>

=== Critics ===
Hiding code using hacks often leads to pages being incorrectly displayed when browsers are updated. These hacks can lead to unexpected behavior in newer browsers that may interpret them differently than their predecessors. Since Internet Explorer 6 and 7 have fallen out of use, CSS hacks have declined as well. Modern methods of feature targeting are less fragile and error-prone.

== Alternatives ==
=== Browser prefixes ===
Each of the most popular browser rendering engines has its own vendor prefix for experimental properties. However, due to the proliferation of these properties in live code, the browser vendors have begun moving away from this practice in favor of feature flags.

==== List of prefixes ====
The following are a list of prefixes from various layout engines:

Vendor Prefix	In Use	Layout Engine	Created by	Used by
-ah-	Yes	Formatter	Antenna House	Antenna House Formatter
-apple-	Yes	WebKit	Apple Inc.	Apple Safari 2.0, Opera Widgets, WebKit-Based Browsers (as legacy prefix)
-atsc-			Advanced Television Systems Committee standards	
-epub-	Yes	WebKit	EPUB Working Group	Chromium / Google Chrome, WebKit-Based Browsers
-fx-	Yes		Sun Microsystems (now acquired by Oracle Corporation)	JavaFX applications
-hp-			Hewlett-Packard (now HP Inc. and Hewlett Packard Enterprise)	
-khtml-	Yes	KHTML / WebKit	KDE	KDE Konqueror / Apple Safari 1.1 through Safari 2.0, WebKit-Based Browsers (as a legacy prefix)
-moz-	Yes	Gecko	Mozilla Foundation	Gecko-Based Browsers[?], Mozilla Firefox
-ms-	Yes	Trident / MSHTML	Microsoft Corporation	Microsoft Internet Explorer
mso-		Office	Microsoft Corporation	Microsoft Office[?]
-o-	Yes	Presto	Opera Software	Opera desktop Browser up to version 12.16, Opera Mini, and Opera Mobile up to version 12.1, Nintendo DS & Nintendo DSi Browser, Nintendo Wii Internet Channel
-prince-	Yes	Prince	YesLogic	YesLogic Prince
-rim-		WebKit	BlackBerry Limited	RIM Blackberry Browser
-ro-	Yes	MARTHA	RealObjects	RealObjects PDFreactor
-tc-			TallComponents	TallComponents
-wap-	Yes	Presto	The WAP Forum	Opera Desktop Browser and Opera Mobile, The WAP Forum
-webkit-	Yes	WebKit/Blink	Apple Inc. (WebKit)/ Google Inc. (Blink)	Apple Safari & Safari for iOS (WebKit), Chromium / Google Chrome desktop and mobile (Blink), Opera desktop and mobile from version 14 (Blink), Android browser (Blink), Nokia MeeGo Browser 8.5, Nokia Symbian Browser 7.0 and later (WebKit), Blackberry Browser 6.0 and later (WebKit).
-xv-	No	Presto	Opera Software	Opera Desktop Browser for Windows 2000/XP

==== Example ====
/* Cross-browser css3 linear-gradient */
.linear-gradient {

  /* Gecko browser (Firefox) */
  background-image: -moz-linear-gradient(top, #D7D 0%, #068 100%);

  /* Opera */
  background-image: -o-linear-gradient(top, #D7D 0%, #068 100%);

  /* older Webkit syntax */
  background-image: -webkit-gradient(linear, left top, left bottom,
    color-stop(0, #D7D), color-stop(1, #068));

  /* Webkit (Safari, Chrome, iOS, Android) */
  background-image: -webkit-linear-gradient(top, #D7D 0%, #068 100%);

  /* W3C */
  background-image: linear-gradient(to bottom, #D7D 0%, #068 100%);

}

==== Limitation ====
Vendor prefixes were designed for features that were under development, meaning that the syntax may not even be final. Also, adding a rule for each browser's implementation of a function does not scale well when you want to support many browsers. Consequently, the major browser vendors are moving away from vendor prefixes in favor of other methods such as @supports feature queries.

=== Feature deletion ===
==== JavaScript feature detection ====
Multiple JavaScript libraries exist to detect what features are available in a particular browser so that CSS rules can be written to target them. Libraries such as Modernizr add classes to the html element, allowing for CSS rules such as .cssgradients .header.

==== Feature queries ====
A new feature known as feature queries was introduced in CSS3, allowing the detection of specific functionality within the CSS (without requiring the use of a JavaScript library for feature detection). This new directive can be used to check for the support or lack of support for a specific feature, and checks can be combined with and, or, and not. Obviously, @supports rules will only work on browsers that support @supports.

header {
    display: block;
}

@supports (display: flex) {
    header {
        display: flex;
    }
}

=== Script polyfills ===
While JavaScript feature detection and @supports rules can help to target browsers that require fallback functionality, they will not address bugs in specific browsers or enable that advanced functionality. Polyfills, scripts that make behavior consistent across all browsers, can be used to add support for new CSS rules (for example, media queries in IE 8) as well as fix bugs in specific browsers. Since polyfills add or fix functionality in browsers that do not have it, they serve a different purpose than feature queries, but can be used in combination with them.
