= Windows XP 64-bit =

Windows XP 64-bit can refer to:

- Windows XP Professional x64 Edition, an operating system for x86-64 processors
- Windows XP 64-bit Edition, an operating system for IA-64 (Itanium) processors
