= WoW64 =

Subsystem of 64-bit Windows for running 32-bit Windows programs

- Other names: Windows 32-bit on Windows 64-bit
- Developer: Microsoft
- Release: October 25, 2001; 24 years ago
- Operating system: Microsoft Windows
- Platform: IA-64, x86-64, ARM64
- Type: Compatibility layer
- License: Proprietary commercial software
- Website: docs.microsoft.com/en-us/windows/desktop/WinProg64/running-32-bit-applications

WoW64 (Windows 32-bit on Windows 64-bit) is a subsystem of the Microsoft Windows operating system capable of running 32-bit applications on 64-bit Windows. It is included in all 64-bit versions of Windows, except in Windows Server Core where it is an optional component, and Windows Nano Server where it is not included. (Note: Specifically: Windows XP Professional x64 Edition; IA-64 and x64 versions of Windows Server 2003; x64 versions of Windows Vista, Windows Server 2008, Windows 7, Windows 8, Windows Server 2012, Windows 8.1, Windows 10, Windows Server 2016, Windows Server 2019, Windows 11, Windows Server 2022; ARM64 versions of Windows 10, Windows 11 and Windows Server 2022.; Wine, which is not a Microsoft product, also offers experimental WoW64 in its x64 version. Wine also has wow64.dll, wow64win.dll, and wow64cpu.dll.) WoW64 aims to take care of many of the differences between 32-bit Windows and 64-bit Windows, particularly involving structural changes to Windows itself.

== Translation libraries ==
The WoW64 subsystem comprises a lightweight compatibility layer that has similar interfaces on all 64-bit versions of Windows. It aims to create a 32-bit environment that provides the interfaces required to run unmodified 32-bit Windows applications on a 64-bit system. WOW64 is implemented using several DLLs, some of which include:

1. Wow64.dll, the core interface to the Windows NT kernel that translates (thunks) between 32-bit and 64-bit calls, including pointer and call stack manipulations
2. Wow64win.dll, which provides the appropriate entry-points for 32-bit applications (win32k thunks)
3. A dll that allows 32-bit x86 instructions to be executed, which varies by instruction set architecture.
  - On x86-64, Wow64cpu.dll takes care of switching the processor from 32-bit to 64-bit mode. This is computationally cheap, as x86-64 machines have a native mode for running 32-bit x86 code.
  - On IA-64 (Itanium 2), three files are needed for a slower software emulation: Wow64cpu.dll, a "CPU abstraction layer"; IA32Exec.bin, the x86 software emulator; and Wowia32x.dll, the bridge between the emulator and the WOW64 system.
  - On ARMv8 64-bit, xtajit.dll for x86 emulation, and wowarmhw.dll for switching to ARM32 mode.

== Registry and file system ==
The WoW64 subsystem also handles other key aspects of running 32-bit applications. It is involved in managing the interaction of 32-bit applications with the Windows components such as the Registry, which has distinct keys for 64-bit and 32-bit applications. For example, HKEY_LOCAL_MACHINE\Software\Wow6432Node is the 32-bit equivalent of HKEY_LOCAL_MACHINE\Software (although 32-bit applications are not aware of this redirection). Some Registry keys are mapped from 64-bit to their 32-bit equivalents, while others have their contents mirrored, depending on the edition of Windows.

The operating system uses the %SystemRoot%\system32 directory for its 64-bit library and executable files. This is done for backward compatibility reasons, as many legacy applications are hardcoded to use that path. When executing 32-bit applications, WoW64 transparently redirects access to "system32" (e.g. DLL loads) to %SystemRoot%\SysWoW64, which contains 32-bit libraries and executables. Exceptions from these redirects are:

- %SystemRoot%\system32\catroot
- %SystemRoot%\system32\catroot2
- %SystemRoot%\system32\driverstore (redirected on Windows Server 2008, Windows Vista, Windows Server 2003 and Windows XP)
- %SystemRoot%\system32\drivers\etc
- %SystemRoot%\system32\logfiles
- %SystemRoot%\system32\spool

The redirection helps to keep 32-bit applications working without them needing to be aware of the WoW64 status. If a 32-bit application wants to access the real %SystemRoot%\System32, it can do so through the pseudo-directory %SystemRoot%\sysnative since Windows Vista. Detection of Wow64 status is possible via IsWow64Process().

There are two Program Files directories each visible to both 32-bit and 64-bit applications. The directory that stores the 32 bit files is called Program Files (x86) to differentiate between the two, while the 64 bit maintains the traditional Program Files name without any additional qualifier. File system redirection is not used to maintain the separation; instead, WoW64 changes FOLDERID_ProgramFiles and similar query results to point installer programs to the correct directory.

A few new directories are also found on ARM64, where WOW64 handles not only the running of 32-bit x86 programs, but also 32-bit ARM programs, which uses SysArm32 instead. ARM64 also supports the so-called CHPE "compiled-hybrid-PE", which has ARM64 code in a x86 dll container (for more efficient, emulation-free compatibility); these dlls are found in SyCHPE32.

== Application compatibility ==
32-bit applications that include only 32-bit kernel-mode device drivers, or that plug into the process space of components that are implemented purely as 64-bit processes (e.g. Windows Explorer) cannot be executed on a 64-bit platform.

32-bit service applications are supported. The SysWOW64 folder located in the Windows folder on the OS drive contains several applications to support 32-bit applications (e.g. cmd.exe, odbcad32.exe, to register ODBC connections for 32-bit applications). 16-bit legacy applications for MS-DOS and early versions of Windows are usually incompatible with 64-bit versions of Windows Vista, 7, 8, and 10, but can be run on a 64-bit Windows OS via virtualization software. 32-bit versions of Windows XP, Vista, 7, 8, and 10 on the other hand, can usually run with few to no problems. 16-bit applications cannot run directly on x64 editions of Windows because the operating system does not support the NTVDM subsystem on these platforms. Although x86 processors support Virtual 8086 mode in certain operating modes, this mode is unavailable when running in 64-bit mode.

Internet Explorer is implemented as both a 32-bit and a 64-bit application because of the large number of 32-bit ActiveX components on the Internet that would not be able to plug into the 64-bit version.

Previously, the 32-bit version was used by-default and it was difficult to set the 64-bit version to be the default browser. This changed in Internet Explorer 10, which ran 32-bit add-ons inside a 64-bit session, eliminating the need to switch between the two versions. If a user was to go into the 32-bit folder (typically C:\Program Files (x86)\Internet Explorer) and double-click the iexplore.exe file there, the 64-bit version will still load. In Internet Explorer 9 and previous, this would load only the 32-bit version.

As of 2010, a bug in the translation layer of the x64 version of WoW64 also renders all 32-bit applications that rely on the Windows API function GetThreadContext incompatible. Such applications include application debuggers, call stack tracers (e.g. IDEs displaying call stack) and applications that use garbage collection (GC) engines. One of the more widely used but affected GC engines is the Boehm GC. It is also used as the default garbage collector of the equally popular Mono. While Mono has introduced a new (but optional) GC as of October 2010 called SGen-GC, it performs stack scanning in the same manner as Boehm GC, thus also making it incompatible under WoW64. No fix has been provided as of July 2016, although workarounds have been suggested.

== Performance ==
According to Microsoft, 32-bit software running under WOW64 (x64) has similar performance to executing under 32-bit Windows, but with fewer threads possible. On a non-x64 system, WOW64 incurs a performance overhead due to the software emulation involved.

A 32-bit application can be given a full 4 gigabytes of virtual memory on a 64-bit system, whereas on a 32-bit system, some of this addressable memory is lost because it is used by the kernel and memory-mapped peripherals such as the display adaptor, typically resulting in apps being able to use either 2GB or 3GB of RAM at most.

== See also ==
- Shim (computing)
- User Account Control also has a mechanism for dealing with "older" programs that write files to specific areas, on "newer" windows. Files written from a process without administrator privileges to protected locations, such as Program Files and windows\system32, will be redirected to a virtual store directory.
- Windows on Windows
