= Win32s =

32-bit application runtime environment

Win32s is a 32-bit application runtime environment for the Microsoft Windows 3.1 and 3.11 operating systems. It allowed some 32-bit applications to run on the 16-bit operating system using call thunks. A beta version of Win32s was available in October 1992. Version 1.10 was released in July 1993 simultaneously with Windows NT 3.1. The final Win32s version 1.30c was released in February 1996.

== Concept and characteristics ==
Win32s was intended as a partial implementation of the Win32 Windows API as it existed in early versions of Windows NT.

The "s" in Win32s signifies subset, as Win32s lacked a number of Windows NT functions, including multi-threading, asynchronous I/O, newer serial port functions and many GDI extensions. This generally limited it to "Win32s applications" which were specifically designed for the Win32s platform, although some standard Win32 programs would work correctly, including Microsoft's 3D Pinball Space Cadet and some of Windows 95's included applets. Early versions of Internet Explorer (up to Version 5) were also Win32s compatible, although these also existed in 16-bit format. Generally, for a 32-bit application to be compatible with Win32s, it had to not use more than 16MB of memory or any extended features such as DirectX.

Win32s inherits many of the limitations of the Win16 environment. True Win32 applications execute within a private virtual address space, whereas Windows 3.x used an address space shared among all running applications. An application running on Win32s has the shared address space and cooperative multitasking characteristics of Windows 3.1. Consequently, for a Win32 application to run on Win32s, it must contain relocation information.

A technique named thunking is fundamental to the implementation of Win32s as well as Chicago-kernel operating systems, which are Windows 95, Windows 98, and Windows Me. However, allowing user-level thunking greatly complicates attempts to provide stable memory management or memory protection on a system-wide basis, as well as core or kernel security—this allows poorly written applications to undermine system stability on Win32s, as well as the Chicago-kernel systems. 32-bit versions of Windows NT transparently provide a virtual machine for running Win16 applications, although this feature was removed from 64-bit versions of Windows.

== Compatibility ==
Win32s-compatible applications could be built using Microsoft's development tools, as well as at least Borland C++ 4.x and Symantec C++ (now Digital Mars C++). However, several program compilation options (such as EXE relocation information) and DLLs which were implicit in Windows NT 3.1 have to be included with the application in Win32s. Microsoft ceased support for Win32s in Visual C++ version 4.2 released in late 1996.

Win32s included an implementation of the card game FreeCell as an example application, a couple of years before the game became famous with its inclusion in Windows 95.

Warcraft II: Tides of Darkness, a DOS game, included a level editor that required Win32s to run. The editor used a Windows GUI for displaying the large maps because high-resolution graphic modes were already handled by Windows. The NCSA Mosaic web browser version 2 also required Win32s.

C# applications can be compiled by the CoreRT compiler into Win32 code that is accepted by the 1994 Visual C++ linker. This combination produces Win32 executables that can run on Windows 3.1 with Win32s.
