= Removal of Internet Explorer =

Removal of a Microsoft Windows feature

The idea of the removal of Internet Explorer (IE) from Windows was proposed during the United States v. Microsoft Corp. case. Later, the idea was brought up as a way to protect Windows systems from attacks via IE vulnerabilities.

The process of removing Internet Explorer from a personal computer has changed over the browser's version history, but the nature of many of its upgrades and installation methods has been a matter of public interest. The first version to be included was version 2 with Windows 95 in late 1996. Later, users who upgraded to IE3 (which came out in 1996), could still use the last IE, because the installation converted the previous version to a separate directory. However, Internet Explorer 4 created a controversy with its shell integration with Windows Explorer. With later versions, removal (or inability to do so) became more complicated. With the release of Internet Explorer 7, shell integration began being reduced, such as changing ActiveX hosting and a different look than Windows Explorer.

It was proposed that a special version of Windows 7, Windows 7 E, would be shipped without Internet Explorer in Europe as a result of EU antitrust investigations against Microsoft. However, in July 2009, Microsoft canceled the Windows 7 E editions due to negative reactions from computer manufacturers. In 2015, Microsoft released Microsoft Edge [Legacy] based on EdgeHTML on launch along with Windows 10. Later, in 2020 a Chromium-based [New] Edge was released and replaced IE's status as the default browser in Windows 10. IE 11 is still available and preinstalled on Windows 10, but users setting up their computers for the first time have to actively seek it from the Windows Accessories folder in the Start menu since it is not pinned to the taskbar by default. The main reason for keeping Internet Explorer in Windows 10 is to run websites based on legacy HTML technologies which are not or improperly supported in Microsoft Edge.

On May 19, 2021, Microsoft announced that Internet Explorer will be no longer supported on June 15, 2022 (Note: Retirement does not affect Windows 10 LTSC or their Server counterparts' Internet Explorer 11 desktop applications. MSHTML (Trident) engine was also unaffected.) and as part of transition, IE mode will be available on the new Microsoft Edge which allows launch older ActiveX controls and legacy websites until at least 2029. Internet Explorer was removed upon the release of Windows 11, although it was disabled and some of its files are still stored in Windows' Program Files folder. Users that are trying to run iexplore.exe via Run command will be redirected to Microsoft Edge. Additionally, if it is run for the first time since the release of Edge Chromium, IE11 will now open a new tab that redirects to Edge's website, with a notice that "some websites no longer support Internet Explorer". Internet Explorer is also disabled on Windows 10 Semi-Annual Channel after installing the February 14, 2023 security update. Visual references of the browser were originally designated to be removed on Windows 10 on June 13, 2023, however on May 19, 2023, Microsoft withdrew the change due to objection by organizations.

== Overview ==
Internet Explorer comes as an integrated component of Windows that cannot be uninstalled. Newer versions of Internet Explorer are sometimes released for existing operating systems, replacing the older version. Optionally, users may later choose to revert this upgrade. Starting with Windows 2000, it is possible to disable Internet Explorer: The user can no longer launch it but its web browser engine remains operational for applications that use it.

The idea of removing Internet Explorer was proposed during the United States v. Microsoft Corp. case. One of Microsoft's arguments during the trial, however, was that removing Internet Explorer from Windows may result in system instability.

== Definition ==
It is unclear what it means to "remove IE" because such a removal depends on being able to determine which files or functions on an installed Windows system are part of IE — that is, to draw a line between IE and the rest of Windows. Microsoft has held that this is not meaningful; that in Windows 98 and newer versions, "Internet Explorer" is not a separate piece of software but simply a brand name for the web browsing and HTML rendering capacities of the Windows operating system. In this view, the result of removing IE is simply a damaged Windows system; to have a working system without IE one must replace Windows entirely.

In contrast, some programmers and security writers have held that it is possible to have a useful and working Windows system with IE excised. These people include consultant Fred Vorck, who advocates that consumers should have the choice to remove "integrated" features of Microsoft Windows and participates in the HFSLIP project; Dino Nuhagic, who is the creator of nLite, a product that allows users to remove Windows components like Internet Explorer and Windows Media Player; and Shane Brooks, who created 98lite and XPLite to remove and manage Windows components after the installation of the operating system. Some people have suggested the use of alternative browsers instead of Internet Explorer, to try reduce the risk of vulnerabilities.

== Methods ==
Methods have been developed by these programmers and others to remove Internet Explorer from Windows 95 after installing, as well as before install time. Removing Internet Explorer from Windows 2000, Windows XP and Windows Server 2003 is also possible at installation time.

Australian computer scientist Shane Brooks demonstrated that Windows 98 could in fact run with Internet Explorer removed. Brooks made his work available as a freeware removal utility called IEradicator, which removes all versions of IE from all versions of Windows 9x, but leaving the rendering engine and some other components behind for application compatibility. Brooks went on to develop a more sophisticated program for Windows 98 and Windows ME, marketed as 98lite, which turns IE, along with several other "mandatory" Windows components, including the IE components left behind by IEradicator, into optional components that can be added or removed from the OS at will. He later created XPLite, which renders many parts of Windows 2000 and XP into optional components. Both of Brooks's programs can remove IE after the installation of the operating system.

== Impacts ==
Removing Internet Explorer does have a number of consequences. Some programs bundled with Windows, such as Outlook Express, and some basic Windows components, such as Help and Support, depend on libraries installed by IE in order to function. Before Windows Vista, it was not possible to run Windows Update without IE because the service used ActiveX technology, which no other web browser supports. With IE removed they fail to work, either partially or entirely. In addition, third-party web browsers based on MSHTML engine require IE and stop working without it.

Some organizations use third-party extensions like IE Tab or IEability to emulate Internet Explorer webpages without the need for Microsoft Edge's IE Mode, especially after it will be removed in at least 2029.
