= United States v. Microsoft Corp. =

2001 American antitrust law case

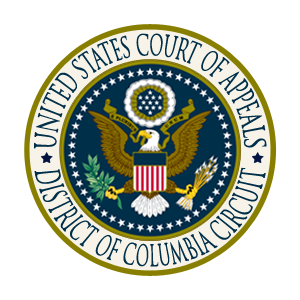
- Court: United States Court of Appeals for the District of Columbia Circuit
- Full case name: United States of America v. Microsoft Corporation
- Argued: February 26–27, 2001
- Decided: June 28, 2001
- Citation: 253 F.3d 34

Case history
- Prior history: United States v. Microsoft Corp., 87 F. Supp. 2d 30 (D.D.C. 2000); 97 F. Supp. 2d 59 (D.D.C. 2000), direct appeal denied, pet. cert. denied, 530 U.S. 1301 (2000).
- Subsequent history: Microsoft Corp. v. United States, 534 U.S. 952 (2001) (pet. cert. denied); 224 F. Supp. 2d 76 (D.D.C. 2002); 231 F. Supp. 2d 144 (D.D.C. 2002) (on remand), aff'd in part and rev'd in part, 373 F.3d 1199 (D.C. Cir. 2004)

Holding
- Business practices conducted by Microsoft, when tying its web browser and operating system, was monopolistic behavior per the Sherman Antitrust Act.

Court membership
- Judges sitting: Harry T. Edwards, CJ; Stephen F. Williams, Douglas H. Ginsburg, David B. Sentelle, A. Raymond Randolph, Judith W. Rogers, and David S. Tatel, JJ.

Case opinions
- Per curiam

Laws applied
- Sherman Antitrust Act

United States of America v. Microsoft Corporation, 253 F.3d 34 (D.C. Cir. 2001), was a landmark American antitrust law case at the United States Court of Appeals for the District of Columbia Circuit. The U.S. government accused Microsoft of illegally monopolizing the web browser market for Windows, primarily through the legal and technical restrictions it put on the abilities of PC manufacturers (OEMs) and users to uninstall Internet Explorer and use other programs such as Netscape and Java.

At the initial trial which began in 1998, the United States District Court for the District of Columbia ruled that Microsoft's actions constituted unlawful monopolization under Section 2 of the Sherman Antitrust Act of 1890, but the U.S. Court of Appeals for the D.C. Circuit partially overturned that judgment in 2001. The two parties later reached a settlement in which Microsoft agreed to modify some of its business practices.

== History ==
By 1984 Microsoft was one of the most successful software companies, with $55 million in 1983 sales. InfoWorld wrote:

[Microsoft] is widely recognized as the most influential company in the microcomputer-software industry. Claiming more than a million installed MS-DOS machines, founder and chairman Bill Gates has decided to certify Microsoft's jump on the rest of the industry by dominating applications, operating systems, peripherals and, most recently, book publishing. Some insiders say Microsoft is attempting to be the IBM of the software industry. Although Gates says that he isn't trying to dominate the industry with sheer numbers, his strategy for dominance involves Microsoft's new Windows operating system ... "Our strategies and energies as a company are totally committed to Windows, in the same way that we're committed to operating-system kernels like MS-DOS and Xenix," says Gates. "We're also saying that only applications that take advantage of Windows will be competitive in the long run."

Softletter estimated that in 1986 Microsoft had 8% (more than $250 million) of total revenue of the top 100 microcomputer software companies. Of the 15 million Americans who used a personal computer in their job, more than 90% used MS-DOS. Gates said in 1984 that applications such as Multiplan and Word were InfoWorld said, "not a big-time operation", but by 1987, Richard A. Shaffer of Technologic Computer Letter compared the company's dominance of operating systems, and consequent benefit to its application software, to a baseball game in which "Microsoft owns all the bats and the field". The Federal Trade Commission began an inquiry in 1990 over whether Microsoft was abusing its monopoly in the PC operating system market. The commissioners deadlocked with a 2–2 vote in 1993 and closed the investigation, but the Department of Justice (DOJ), led by Janet Reno, opened its own investigation later that year, resulting in a settlement on July 15, 1994, in which Microsoft consented not to tie other Microsoft products to the sale of Windows but remained free to integrate additional features into the operating system. In the years that followed, Microsoft insisted that Internet Explorer (IE) was not a product but a feature that it was allowed to add to Windows, although the DOJ did not agree with this definition.

The government alleged that Microsoft had abused monopoly power on Intel-based personal computers in its handling of operating system and web browser integration. The central issue was whether Microsoft was allowed to bundle its IE web browser software with its Windows operating system. Bundling the two products was allegedly a key factor in Microsoft's victory in the browser wars of the late 1990s, as every Windows user had a copy of IE. It was further alleged that this restricted the market for competing web browsers (such as Netscape Navigator or Opera), since it typically took extra time to buy and install the competing browsers. Underlying these disputes were questions of whether Microsoft had manipulated its application programming interfaces to favor IE over third-party browsers. The government also questioned Microsoft's conduct in enforcing restrictive licensing agreements with original equipment manufacturers who were required to include that arrangement.

Microsoft argued that the merging of Windows and IE was the result of innovation and competition, that the two were now the same product and inextricably linked, and that consumers were receiving the benefits of IE for free. Opponents countered that IE was still a separate product that did not need to be tied to Windows, since a separate version of IE was available for Mac OS. They also asserted that IE was not really free because its development and marketing costs may have inflated the price of Windows.

Bill Gates himself denied that Microsoft was a monopoly, stating "Microsoft follows the rules. Microsoft is subject to the rules." He further compared the situation with IBM thirty years prior: "People who feared IBM were wrong. Technology is ever-changing."

== District Court trial ==
The case was initially tried before Judge Thomas Penfield Jackson at the United States District Court for the District of Columbia. The suit began on May 18, 1998, with the Department of Justice joined by the Attorneys General of twenty U.S. states and the District of Columbia. The case organized by the Department of Justice was focused less on interoperability, and more on predatory strategies and market barriers to entry; the DOJ built upon the allegation that Microsoft forced computer makers to include its web browser as a part of the installation of Windows software.

Bill Gates was called "evasive and nonresponsive" by a source present at his videotaped deposition. He argued over the definitions of words such as "compete", "concerned", "ask", and "we"; certain portions of the proceeding would later provoke laughter from the judge when an excerpted version was shown in court. Businessweek reported that "early rounds of his deposition show him offering obfuscatory answers and saying 'I don't recall' so many times that even the presiding judge had to chuckle. Many of Gates's denials and pleas of ignorance were directly refuted by prosecutors with snippets of e-mails Gates both sent and received." Intel Vice-president Steven McGeady, called as a witness, quoted Paul Maritz, a senior Microsoft vice president, as having stated an intention to "extinguish" and "smother" rival Netscape Communications Corporation and to "cut off Netscape's air supply" by giving away a clone of Netscape's flagship product for free.

A number of videotapes were submitted as evidence by Microsoft during the trial, including one that demonstrated that removing Internet Explorer from Microsoft Windows caused slowdowns and malfunctions in Windows. In the videotaped demonstration of what then-Microsoft vice president Jim Allchin stated to be a seamless segment filmed on one PC, the government noticed that some icons mysteriously disappeared and reappeared on the PC's desktop, suggesting that the effects might have been falsified. Allchin admitted that the blame for the tape problems lay with some of his staff. "They ended up filming it—grabbing the wrong screen shot," he said of the incident. Later, Allchin re-ran the demonstration and provided a new videotape, but in so doing Microsoft dropped the claim that Windows is slowed down when IE is removed. Mark Murray, a Microsoft spokesperson, complained about the government attorneys "nitpicking on issues like video production."

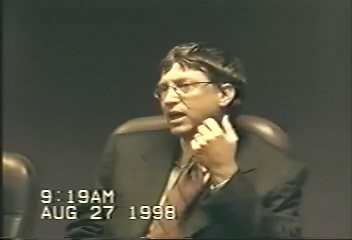
Bill Gates during his August 27, 1998 deposition

Microsoft later submitted a second inaccurate videotape into evidence. The issue was how easy or difficult it was for America Online users to download and install Netscape Navigator onto a Windows PC. Microsoft's videotape showed the process as being quick and easy, resulting in the Netscape icon appearing on the user's desktop. The government produced its own videotape of the same process, revealing that Microsoft's videotape had conveniently removed a long and complex part of the procedure and that the Netscape icon was not placed on the desktop, requiring a user to search for it. Brad Chase, a Microsoft vice president, verified the government's tape and conceded that Microsoft's own tape was falsified.

When the judge suggested that Microsoft offer a version of Windows that did not include Internet Explorer, Microsoft responded that the company would offer manufacturers a choice: one version of Windows that was obsolete, or another that did not work properly. The judge asked, "It seemed absolutely clear to you that I entered an order that required that you distribute a product that would not work?" David Cole, a Microsoft vice president, replied, "In plain English, yes. We followed that order. It wasn't my place to consider the consequences of that."

Gates and his successor as CEO Steve Ballmer were so worried about the outcome of the case that they discussed leaving Microsoft "if they really screw the company that badly, really just split it up in a totally irrational way," Gates recalled. Microsoft defended itself in the public arena, arguing that its attempts to "innovate" were under attack by rival companies jealous of its success, and that government prosecutors were merely their pawns. A full-page ad appeared in The Washington Post and The New York Times on June 2, 1999, created by a think tank called The Independent Institute. The ad was presented as "An Open Letter to President Clinton from 240 Economists on Antitrust Protectionism." It said in part, "Consumers did not ask for these antitrust actions – rival business firms did. Consumers of high technology have enjoyed falling prices, expanding outputs, and a breathtaking array of new products and innovations. ... Increasingly, however, some firms have sought to handicap their rivals by turning to government for protection. Many of these cases are based on speculation about some vaguely specified consumer harm in some unspecified future, and many of the proposed interventions will weaken successful U.S. firms and impede their competitiveness abroad."

=== Judgment ===
Judge Jackson issued his findings of fact on November 5, 1999, holding that Microsoft's dominance of the x86-based personal computer operating systems market constituted a monopoly, and that Microsoft had taken actions to crush threats to that monopoly, including applications from Apple, Java, Netscape, Lotus Development, RealNetworks, Linux, and others. On April 3, 2000, Jackson issued his conclusions of law, holding that Microsoft had engaged in monopolization, attempted monopolization, and tying in violation of Sections 1 and 2 of the Sherman Antitrust Act.

On June 7, 2000, the District Court ordered a breakup of Microsoft as its remedy. According to that judgment, Microsoft would have to be split into two separate units, one to produce the operating system and one to produce other software components. Microsoft immediately appealed the judgment to the D.C. Circuit Court of Appeals.

== Appeals Court decision ==
After Microsoft filed its appeal, the U.S. government and the states in the suit filed a petition for certiorari before judgment, a process that would skip the intermediate Circuit Court and send the case directly to the U.S. Supreme Court. Such an action is permitted by a section of the United States Code that gives the Supreme Court jurisdiction to hear direct appeals from the District Court level in certain antitrust cases initiated by the federal government, if "the district judge who adjudicated the case enters an order stating that immediate consideration of the appeal by the Supreme Court is of general public importance in the administration of justice." The states also filed a petition for certiorari before judgment at the Supreme Court, requesting the same direct appeal process without going through the Circuit Court. The Supreme Court rejected these requests and sent the appeal to the D.C. Circuit Court.

On June 28, 2001, the Circuit Court overturned Judge Jackson's rulings against Microsoft. This was partly because Jackson had improperly discussed the case with the news media while it was still in progress, violating the code of conduct for American judges. The Circuit Court judges accused Jackson of unethical conduct and determined that he should have recused himself from the case. Thus the Circuit Court adopted a "drastically altered scope of liability" due to Jackson's conduct, which was favorable for Microsoft.

Jackson's response was that Microsoft's conduct itself was the cause of any "perceived bias"; Microsoft executives had, according to him, "proved, time and time again, to be inaccurate, misleading, evasive, and transparently false. ... Microsoft is a company with an institutional disdain for both the truth and for rules of law that lesser entities must respect. It is also a company whose senior management is not averse to offering specious testimony to support spurious defenses to claims of its wrongdoing."

Ultimately, the Circuit Court overturned Jackson's holding that Microsoft should be broken up as an illegal monopoly. However, the Circuit Court did not overturn Jackson's findings of fact, and held that traditional antitrust analysis was not equipped to consider software-related practices like browser tie-ins. The case was remanded back to the D.C. District Court for further proceedings on this matter, with Judge Colleen Kollar-Kotelly presiding.

== Settlement ==
The Department of Justice, then under Bush administration attorney general John Ashcroft, announced on September 6, 2001, that it was no longer seeking to break up Microsoft and would instead seek a lesser antitrust penalty. Microsoft decided to draft a settlement proposal allowing PC manufacturers to adopt non-Microsoft software.

On November 1, 2001, the DOJ reached an agreement with Microsoft to settle the case. The proposed settlement required Microsoft to share its application programming interfaces with third-party companies and appoint a panel of three investigators who would have full access to Microsoft's systems, records, and source code for five years in order to ensure compliance. However, the DOJ did not require Microsoft to change any of its code nor did it prevent Microsoft from tying other software with Windows in the future. On August 5, 2002, Microsoft announced that it would make some concessions towards the proposed final settlement ahead of the judge's decision. On November 1, 2002, Judge Kollar-Kotelly released a ruling that accepted most of the proposed DOJ settlement. Nine states and the District of Columbia (which had been pursuing the case together with the DOJ) did not agree with the settlement, arguing that it did not go far enough to curb Microsoft's anti-competitive business practices. On June 30, 2004, the D.C. Circuit Court approved the settlement with the Justice Department, rejecting the states' claims that the sanctions were inadequate.

In its 2008 Annual Report, Microsoft stated:

Lawsuits brought by the U.S. Department of Justice, 18 states, and the District of Columbia in two separate actions were resolved through a Consent Decree that took effect in 2001 and a Final Judgment entered in 2002. These proceedings imposed various constraints on our Windows operating system businesses. These constraints include limits on certain contracting practices, mandated disclosure of certain software program interfaces and protocols, and rights for computer manufacturers to limit the visibility of certain Windows features in new PCs. We believe we are in full compliance with these rules. However, if we fail to comply with them, additional restrictions could be imposed on us that would adversely affect our business.

Microsoft's obligations under the settlement, as originally drafted, expired on November 12, 2007. However, Microsoft later "agreed to consent to a two-year extension of part of the Final Judgments" dealing with communications protocol licensing, and stated that if the government later wished to extend those aspects of the settlement as far as 2012, it would not object. The government made clear that the extension was intended only to give the relevant part of the settlement "the opportunity to succeed for the period of time it was intended to cover," rather than being due to any "pattern of willful and systematic violations."

== Impact and criticism ==
After the 2002 settlement, industry pundit Robert X. Cringely believed a breakup was not possible, and that "now the only way Microsoft can die is by suicide." Andrew Chin, an antitrust law professor at the University of North Carolina at Chapel Hill who assisted Judge Jackson in drafting the findings of fact at the initial District Court trial, wrote that the settlement gave Microsoft "a special antitrust immunity to license Windows and other 'platform software' under contractual terms that destroy freedom of competition." Law professor Eben Moglen noted that the way Microsoft was required to disclose its APIs and protocols was useful only for “interoperating with a Windows Operating System Product”, not for implementing support of those APIs and protocols in any competing operating system.

Economist Milton Friedman wrote in 1999 that the antitrust case against Microsoft set a dangerous precedent that foreshadowed increasing government regulation of an industry that had been relatively free of government intrusion, and that future technological progress in the industry will be impeded as a result. After the resulting settlement, the magazine Business & Economic Research wrote that, contrary to Friedman's forecasts, the case had to that point had little effect on Microsoft's behavior. The fines, restrictions, and monitoring imposed were not enough to prevent it from "abusing its monopolistic power and too little to prevent it from dominating the software and operating system industry." For that reason, Microsoft remained dominant and monopolistic after the trial, and it continued to stifle competitors and innovative technology.

Richard Stallman, founder of the Free Software Foundation, advocating for computing freedom, provided suggestions to Ralph Nader's Consumer Project on Technology for dealing with Microsoft's behavior in March 1999. He has suggested, for instance, that Microsoft should be required to publish complete documentation of all interfaces between software components, all communications protocols, and all files. In short, the company should not release any implementations for undocumented interfaces. Stallman also noted that Microsoft should refrain from certifying any hardware as compatible with Microsoft software, unless the hardware's complete specifications have been published, so that an alternative software to support the same hardware can be implemented freely.

Chris Butts, writing in the Northwestern Journal of Technology and Intellectual Property, argued that the U.S. government recognized the benefits of including a web browser with an operating system. At the appellate level, the government dropped the claim of tying given that—as laid out in Section 1 of the Sherman Act—it would have had to prove that more harm than good resulted from the type of tying carried out by Microsoft.

== See also ==
- Antitrust, a 2001 film about "NURV", a large software company that represents a fictionalized Microsoft
- Big Tech
- Browser wars
- Criticism of Microsoft
- Enshittification
- Microsoft litigation
- Microshaft Winblows 98, a 1998 video game parodying the Windows 98 interface that featured numerous allusions to United States v. Microsoft Corp.
- Removal of Internet Explorer
