= Windows XP Professional x64 Edition =

Edition of Windows XP for x86-64 computers, released in 2005

- Version of the Windows XP operating system

- Screenshot of Windows XP Professional x64 Edition running the Luna visual style, showing the start menu and the "About Windows" window
- Developer: Microsoft
- OS family: Windows NT
- Working state: No longer supported
- Source model: Closed-source; Source-available (through Shared Source Initiative)
- Initial release: April 25, 2005; 21 years ago
- Final release: Service Pack 2 with May 2019 security update (5.2.3790.6787) / May 14, 2019; 7 years ago
- Kernel type: Hybrid (NT)
- Default user interface: Graphical user interface
- License: Proprietary commercial software
- Official website: Windows XP Professional x64 Edition (archived at Wayback Machine)

Support status
- Mainstream support ended on April 14, 2009. Extended support ended on April 8, 2014.

Windows XP Professional x64 Edition is an edition of Windows XP that supports the x86-64 architecture, released alongside the x86-64 versions of Windows Server 2003 on April 25, 2005. It is designed to use the expanded 64-bit memory address space provided by the x86-64 64-bit extensions to the x86 IA-32 architecture, which was implemented by AMD as "AMD64" with the introduction of the Opteron and Athlon 64 chips (and Sempron processors for Socket 754), and later Intel as "Intel 64" (formerly known as IA-32e and EM64T) with the introduction of the Nocona-based Xeon and Prescott-enhanced Pentium 4 processors.

Windows XP Professional x64 Edition uses the same kernel and code tree as Windows Server 2003 and is serviced by the same service packs. However, it includes client features of Windows XP such as System Restore, Windows Messenger, Fast User Switching, Welcome Screen, Security Center and games, of which Windows Server 2003 does not have.

During the initial development phases (2003–2004), Windows XP Professional x64 Edition was named Windows XP 64-Bit Edition for 64-Bit Extended Systems and later as Windows XP 64-Bit Edition for Extended Systems, as opposed to 64-Bit Edition for Itanium Systems for Windows XP 64-Bit Edition, as the latter was designed for the IA-64 (Itanium) architecture.

== Features ==
Windows XP Professional x64 Edition offers a number of new and updated features not found in the main 32-bit x86 versions of Windows XP:

=== End-user ===
- Internet Information Services (IIS) version 6.0, the same version that was included in Windows Server 2003, is included with Windows XP Professional x64 Edition. All other 32-bit editions of Windows XP have IIS v5.1.
- Windows Media Player version 10, the version that came with Windows Server 2003 Service Pack 1, is included with Windows XP Profesional x64 Edition. Windows XP Professional for x86 originally shipped with Windows Media Player version 8 from RTM to Service Pack 1 and later came with Windows Media Player 9 from Service Pack 2 onwards, with Windows XP Media Center Edition 2005 receiving Windows Media Player 10.
- Internet Protocol Security (IPsec) features and improvements made in Windows Server 2003 were included with Windows XP Professional x64 Edition.
- Shadow Copy, a feature that automatically creates daily backups of files and folders, was first introduced in Windows Server 2003 and is available in Windows XP Professional x64 Edition.
- Remote Desktop Services supports Unicode keyboard input, client-side time-zone redirection, GDI+ rendering primitives for improved performance, FIPS encryption, fallback printer driver, auto-reconnect and new Group Policy settings.
- Files and Settings Transfer Wizard supports migrating settings from both 32-bit and 64-bit Windows XP PCs.

=== Core ===
Windows XP Professional x64 Edition is based on the newer Windows Server 2003 codebase, with improvements to enhance scalability. It also introduces Kernel Patch Protection (also known as PatchGuard) to improve security by helping to eliminate rootkits.

== Advantages ==
The primary benefit of moving to 64-bit is the increase in the maximum allocatable random-access memory (RAM). 32-bit editions of Windows XP are limited to a total of 4 gigabytes. Although the theoretical memory limit of a 64-bit computer is about 16 exabytes (17.1 billion gigabytes), Windows XP Professional x64 Edition is limited to 128 GB of physical memory and 16 terabytes of virtual memory.

Windows XP Professional x64 Edition also offers a number of benefits/advantages over the main 32-bit x86 versions of Windows XP:

- Supports up to two physical CPUs (in separate physical sockets) and up to 64 logical processors (i.e. cores or threads on a single CPU). Windows XP Professional for x86 supported up to two physical CPUs but is limited to a maximum of 32 logical processors.
- Supports GPT-partitioned disks for data volumes (but not bootable volumes) after SP1, which allows disks greater than 2 TB to be used as a single GPT partition for storing data.
- Allows for faster encoding of audio or video, higher video game performance and faster 3D rendering than with 32-bit versions of Windows XP, in 64-bit optimized software.
- Immunity from certain types of viruses and malware targeted at 32-bit versions of Windows XP, as most system files are 64-bit.

== Disadvantages/limitations ==
There are some limitations which apply to Windows XP Professional x64 Edition:

- Only 64-bit drivers are supported.
- Any 32-bit Windows Explorer shell extensions fail to work with the 64-bit version of Windows Explorer, however Windows XP x64 Edition also ships with a 32-bit version of Windows Explorer. It is possible to make this as the default Windows Shell.
- No native support for Type 1 fonts.
- IEEE 1394 (FireWire) audio is not supported.
- Hibernation is not supported if the RAM is greater than 4 GB. This would later be resolved by Windows 7.
- EFI and/or UEFI are not supported. A BIOS with Advanced Configuration and Power Interface (ACPI) is required.
- Only English or Japanese are provided as native display languages. Chinese, French, German, Italian, Japanese, Korean, Spanish and Swedish are available as Multilingual User Interface (MUI) packs for the English version.
- Additionally, the extra registers of the x86-64 architecture can cause a slight decrease in performance with certain applications compared to the same application compiled in 32-bit only x86 code running on 32-bit versions of Windows XP.

== Software compatibility ==
Windows XP Professional x64 Edition uses a technology named Windows-on-Windows 64-bit (WoW64), which permits the execution of 32-bit software. It was first used in Windows XP 64-bit Edition (for Itanium architecture). Later, it was adopted for x64 editions of Windows XP and Windows Server 2003.

Since the x86-64 architecture includes hardware-level support for 32-bit instructions, WoW64 simply switches the process between 32- and 64-bit modes. As a result, x86-64 architecture microprocessors suffer no performance loss when executing 32-bit Windows applications. On the Itanium architecture, WoW64 was required to translate 32-bit x86 instructions into their 64-bit Itanium equivalents—which in some cases were implemented in quite different ways—so that the processor could execute them. All 32-bit processes are shown with *32 in the task manager, while 64-bit processes have no extra text present.

Although 32-bit applications can be run transparently, the mixing of the two types of code within the same process is not allowed. A 64-bit program cannot use a 32-bit dynamic-link library (DLL) and similarly a 32-bit program cannot use a 64-bit DLL. This may lead to the need for library developers to provide both 32-bit and 64-bit binary versions of their libraries. Specifically, 32-bit shell extensions for Windows Explorer fail to work with 64-bit Windows Explorer. Windows XP x64 Edition ships with both 32-bit and 64-bit versions of Windows Explorer. The 32-bit version can become the default Windows Shell. Windows XP x64 Edition also includes both 32-bit and 64-bit versions of Internet Explorer 6, so that users can still use browser extensions or ActiveX controls that are not available in 64-bit versions.

Only 64-bit drivers are supported in Windows XP x64 Edition, but 32-bit codecs are supported as long as the media player that uses them is 32-bit.

=== Installation of programs ===
By default, 64-bit (x86-64) Windows programs are installed onto their own folders under C:\Program Files, while 32-bit (x86/IA-32) Windows programs are installed onto their own folders under C:\Program Files (x86).

== Removed features ==
Some features are not available on Windows XP Professional x64 Edition. Most of these were inherited from Windows Server 2003 Service Pack 1 (of which the operating system was based on), which contained several changes from Windows XP Service Pack 2 for 32-bit (x86) systems:

- NTVDM and Windows on Windows (not to be confused with WoW64, a 32-bit compatibility layer introduced with this version) were removed, so 16-bit Windows applications or native MS-DOS applications cannot run. A similar case can be found on both versions of Windows XP 64-bit Edition for Itanium. Despite this, third-party replacements such as OTVDM/WineVDM (based on MAME's i386 emulation and the 16-bit portion of the popular Windows compatibility layer, Wine) can allow MS-DOS and 16-bit Windows applications to run on Windows XP Professional x64 Edition and later 64-bit versions of Windows.
  - With the removal of NTVDM and Windows on Windows, COMMAND.COM, a command interpreter exclusive to MS-DOS and Windows 9x, was removed.
  - Some old 32-bit programs use 16-bit installers which do not run; however, replacements for 16-bit installers such as ACME Setup versions 2.6, 3.0, 3.01, 3.1 and InstallShield 5.x are hardcoded into WoW64 to mitigate this issue. This is true for later 64-bit versions of Windows.
- Program Manager was removed and replaced with Windows Explorer. The executable is still present, but it was replaced with a compatibility stub that redirects to Explorer. The executable itself would not be removed entirely until Windows Vista.
- Win32 console programs (including Command Prompt) can no longer run in full-screen text mode. This is true for later versions of Windows since Windows Vista, as it is unsupported by WDDM drivers (Windows 10 later brought back full-screen mode to console programs, however this uses the native Windows rendering subsystem instead of text mode).
- Media Bar, which replaced the Radio Toolbar in Internet Explorer 6, was removed.
- The Web Extender Client component for Web Folders (WebDAV) was not included.
- Spell checking in Outlook Express was removed.

== Service packs ==
The RTM version of Windows XP Professional x64 Edition was built from the Windows Server 2003 Service Pack 1 codebase, and because of this, its service packs are also developed separately. For the same reason, Service Pack 2 for Windows XP x64 Edition, released on March 13, 2007, is not the same as Service Pack 2 for 32-bit versions of Windows XP. In fact, due to the earlier release date of the 32-bit version, many of the key features introduced by Service Pack 2 for 32-bit (x86) editions of Windows XP were already present in the RTM version of its x64 counterpart. Service Pack 2 is the last released service pack for Windows XP Professional x64 Edition.

== Upgradeability ==
A machine running Windows XP Professional x64 Edition cannot be directly upgraded to Windows Vista because the 64-bit Vista DVD mistakenly recognizes XP x64 as a 32-bit system. Windows XP x64 does qualify the customer to use an upgrade copy of Windows Vista or Windows 7, however it must be installed as a clean install.

The last version of Microsoft Office to be officially compatible with Windows XP Professional x64 Edition is Office 2007, however Office 2010 can be unofficially installed by disguising the Windows version using Application Verifier. The last version of Internet Explorer compatible with Windows XP Professional x64 Edition is Internet Explorer 8 (Service Pack 2 is required). The last version of Windows Media Player compatible with Windows XP Professional x64 Edition is Windows Media Player 11.

== Support lifecycle ==
Windows XP Professional x64 Edition follows the same support lifecycles as with all other versions of Windows XP. On April 14, 2009, Windows XP Professional x64 Edition's mainstream support expired and the extended support phase began. During the extended support phase, Microsoft continued to provide security updates; however, free technical support, warranty claims, and design changes are no longer being offered. Extended support lasted until April 8, 2014, in line with all other Windows XP editions. After this date, no more security patches or support information are offered.

Because Windows XP Professional x64 Edition uses a different codebase than the 32-bit x86 versions of Windows XP (as well as it being a 64-bit x86-64 based OS), a registry hack that allowed Windows Embedded Standard 2009 and Windows Embedded POSReady 2009 updates to be unofficially installed on Windows XP (potentially allowing updates until April 2019) will not work due to major compatibility issues. Despite this, some users have been able to install these updates successfully with heavily modified update packs that targeted Windows XP Professional x64 Edition instead of the 32-bit x86 version of Windows XP with varying degrees of success.

Although Windows XP Professional x64 Edition is unsupported, Microsoft released an emergency security patch in May 2017 for the OS as well as other unsupported versions of Windows (including Windows Server 2003, Windows Vista and Windows 7 RTM without a service pack), to address a vulnerability that was being leveraged by the WannaCry ransomware attack. In May 2019, an emergency patch was released to address a critical code execution vulnerability in Remote Desktop Services which can be exploited in a similar way as the WannaCry vulnerability.

Microsoft announced in July 2019 that the Microsoft Internet Games services on Windows XP and Windows Me would end on July 31, 2019 (and for Windows 7 on January 22, 2020). Others, such as Steam, had done the same, ending support for Windows XP and Windows Vista in January 2019.

In 2020, Microsoft announced that it would disable the Windows Update service for SHA-1 endpoints for older Windows versions. Since Windows XP Professional x64 Edition did not get an update for SHA-2, Windows Update Services are no longer available on the OS as of late July 2020. As of March 2024, many of the old updates for Windows XP Professional x64 Edition are available on the Microsoft Update Catalog. A third-party tool named Legacy Update allows previously released updates for Windows XP Professional x64 Edition to be installed from the Update Catalog.
