= Ldconfig =

Unix command for configuring and caching shared library links

ldconfig
- Original authors: Sun Microsystems (SunOS), Roland McGrath (Linux/glibc)
- Developers: GNU Project, most contributions by Ulrich Drepper
- Initial release: 1988; 37 years ago (SunOS) 1990s; 34 years ago (Linux/glibc)
- Operating system: Linux, FreeBSD
- Type: Command
- License: glibc: LGPL-2.1-or-later

In computing, ldconfig is a shell command used for creating and updating symbolic links and the cache for shared libraries. It is found in most Linux distributions and FreeBSD, and it is part of the glibc package. ldconfig works by searching for .so files in directories specified in the /etc/ld.so.conf file, the trusted directories (/lib and /usr/lib, or /lib64 and /usr/lib64 on multilib systems), and any directories specified on the command line.

The generated binary cache file, /etc/ld.so.cache, is used by ld.so to speed up library lookup at runtime.

ldconfig can be compared to regsvr32 in Windows and ReactOS, and to dyld in macOS.

== History ==
ldconfig first appeared in SunOS 4.0 which was initially released in 1988. Due to the adoption of the Executable and Linkable Format by the Unix community, the need for a more robust and flexible library management system became apparent. This led to the development of ldconfig within the GNU C Library (glibc).

== Options ==
- -C CACHE – specify a cache other than the default (/etc/ld.so.cache)
- -f CONF – specify a configuration file other than the default (/etc/ld.so.conf)
- -c FORMAT, --format=FORMAT – specify which format to use: new (default), old, or compat)
- -i, --ignore-aux-cache – ignore the auxiliary cache file
- -l – manually link individual libraries
- -n – used to ignore /etc/ld.so.cache and the trusted directories and only process the directories specified on the command line. (-N is implied, so the cache won't be rebuilt)
- -N – skips rebuilding the cache
- -v, --verbose – runs in verbose mode; prints version number, scanned directories, and all created links
- -V, --version – prints the version number
- -X – skips updating links
- -p – prints the current cache
- -r ROOT – specify a directory as the root directory
