= Prefetcher =

Component of Microsoft Windows

The Prefetcher is a component of Microsoft Windows which was introduced in Windows XP. It is a component of the Session Manager Subsystem that can speed up the Windows boot process and shorten the amount of time it takes to start up programs. It accomplishes this by caching files that are needed by an application to RAM as the application is launched, thus consolidating disk reads and reducing disk seeks. This feature was covered by US patent 6,633,968.

Since Windows Vista, the Prefetcher has been extended by SuperFetch and ReadyBoost. SuperFetch attempts to accelerate application launch times by monitoring and adapting to application usage patterns over periods of time, and caching the majority of the files and data needed by them into memory in advance so that they can be accessed very quickly when needed. ReadyBoost (when enabled) uses external memory like a USB flash drive to extend the system cache beyond the amount of RAM installed in the computer. SuperFetch also has a component called ReadyBoot that replaces the Prefetcher for the boot process if the system has 700 MB or more of RAM.

== Overview ==
When a Windows system boots, components of many files need to be read into memory and processed. Often different parts of the same file (e.g. Registry hives) are loaded at different times. As a result, a significant amount of time is spent 'jumping' from file to file and back again multiple times, even though a single access would be more efficient. The prefetcher works by watching what data is accessed during the boot process (including data read from the NTFS Master File Table), and recording a trace file of this activity. The boot fetcher will continue to watch for such activity until 30 seconds after the user's shell has started, or until 60 seconds after all services have finished initializing, or until 120 seconds after the system has booted, whichever elapses first. Prefetcher can analyse virtual memory and page file to determine which binary files to be preloaded.

Future boots can then use the information recorded in this trace file to load code and data in a more efficient fashion (i.e. by re-ordering disk reads to minimise or eliminate the need to access the same file multiple times thus minimising disk head movements).

Application prefetching works in a similar fashion, but is instead localized to a single application's startup. Only the first 10 seconds of activity are monitored.

The prefetcher stores its trace files in the "Prefetch" folder inside the Windows folder (typically C:\Windows\Prefetch). The name of the boot trace file is always NTOSBOOT-B00DFAAD.PF, and application trace files are a concatenation of the application's executable name, a hyphen, a hexadecimal representation of the hash of the path the file resides in, and a ".pf" extension. Applications that host other components (i.e. Microsoft Management Console or Dllhost) have the name of the loaded component included in the computed hash as well; this results in different trace files being created for each component.

Note that the Task Scheduler is the process responsible for parsing the trace data collected by the prefetcher and writing files to the prefetcher directory. As a result, the prefetcher will not operate correctly if the Task Scheduler service is not started.

To further improve access times, the Task Scheduler calls Windows Disk Defragmenter every three days. When the machine is idle, the lists of files and directories that were referenced during the boot process and application startups is processed. The processed result is stored in Layout.ini in the Prefetch directory, and is subsequently passed to the Disk Defragmenter, instructing it to re-order those files into sequential positions on the physical hard drive.

This will further improve performance by minimising the distance that the hard drive's heads have to be moved from one file to the next.

It is possible to trigger this re-ordering (by running "Defrag.exe %systemdrive% -b" from the command line) without running a full defragmentation.

If the system is installed on a solid-state drive, ReadyBoost is disabled.

== Configuration ==
The Prefetcher's configuration is stored in the Windows Registry at HKEY_LOCAL_MACHINE\SYSTEM\CurrentControlSet\Control\Session Manager\Memory Management\PrefetchParameters. The EnablePrefetcher value can set to be one of the following:

- 0=Disabled
- 1=Application prefetching enabled
- 2=Boot prefetching enabled (default on Windows Server 2003 only).
- 3=Application and Boot prefetching enabled (default on desktop versions of Windows).

The recommended value is 3. Values higher than 3 do not increase performance, and changing the value to 2 will not make Windows boot faster.

== Incorrect tweaking of the prefetcher ==
Often found on the Internet is the "/prefetch:1" application tweak, which is a valid but misunderstood switch. It is used to distinguish between different operating modes of an executable in case those different modes would have significantly different prefetch traces.

A second myth is that the user should delete the prefetch folder contents to speed up the computer. If this is done, Windows will need to re-create all the prefetch files again, thereby slowing down Windows during boot and program starts until the prefetch files are created—unless the prefetcher is disabled. Windows maintains prefetch files in the Prefetch folder for up to the 128 most recently launched programs.

== See also ==
- Windows ReadyBoost
- Windows Vista I/O technologies
- List of Microsoft Windows components
- Features new to Windows XP
- readahead – the equivalent Linux technology
- Link prefetching - the equivalent for websites
- Cache prefetching
