= Sysprep =

Microsoft tool for Windows deployment

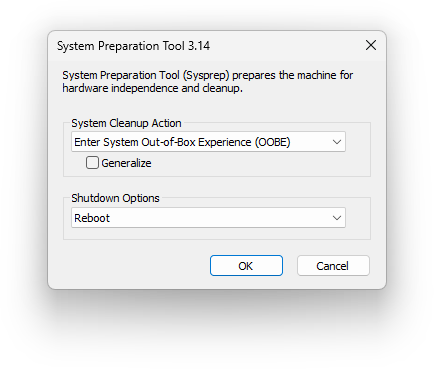
- Sysprep on Windows 11
- Developer: Microsoft
- Operating system: Microsoft Windows

Sysprep /ˈsɪsprɛp/ is Microsoft's System Preparation Tool for Microsoft Windows operating system deployment.

== History ==
Sysprep was originally introduced for use with Windows NT 4.0. Later versions introduced for Windows 2000, Windows XP and Windows Server 2003 are available for download from Microsoft website and included in the Windows CD. Windows Vista is the first version of Windows NT to include a version of Sysprep that was independent of the hardware abstraction layer (HAL), in the "out of box" installation.

== Purpose ==
Desktop deployment is typically performed via disk cloning utility. Sysprep can be used to prepare an operating system for disk cloning and restoration via a disk image.

Windows operating system installations include many unique elements per installation that need to be "generalized" before capturing and deploying a disk image to multiple computers. Some of these elements include:

- Computer name
- Security Identifier (SID)
- Driver Cache

Sysprep seeks to solve these issues by allowing for the generation of new computer names, unique SIDs, and custom driver cache databases during the Sysprep process.

Administrators can use tools such as SetupMgr.exe (Windows XP) or the Windows Automated Installation Kit (Windows Vista/7/Server 2008) to generate answer files that Sysprep will process on new computer deployments.

== Alternatives to Sysprep ==
Mark Russinovich of Sysinternals created a partial alternative to Sysprep, named NewSID, in 1997. However, after his own further analysis and research, Russinovich concluded that having duplicate SIDs is a non-issue and arranged NewSID's retirement.
