= Regsvr32 =

Command-line utility

regsvr32
- Developers: Microsoft, ReactOS Contributors
- Release: February 17, 2000; 26 years ago
- Operating system: Windows, ReactOS
- Platform: 32-bit and 64-bit
- Type: Command
- License: Windows: Proprietary commercial software ReactOS: GNU General Public License
- Website: docs.microsoft.com/en-us/windows-server/administration/windows-commands/regsvr32

In computing, regsvr32 (Register Server) is a command-line utility in Microsoft Windows and ReactOS for registering and unregistering DLLs and ActiveX controls in the operating system Registry. Despite the suffix "32" in the name of the file, there are both 32-bit and 64-bit versions of this utility (with identical names, but in different directories). regsvr32 requires elevated privileges.

To be used with regsvr32, a DLL must export the functions DllRegisterServer and DllUnregisterServer.

The regsvr32 command is comparable to ldconfig in Linux.

== Example usage ==
regsvr32 shmedia.dll for registering a file

regsvr32 shmedia.dll /s for registering a file without the dialog box ( silent )

regsvr32 /u shmedia.dll for unregistering a file

regsvr32 shmedia.dll /u /s for unregistering a file without the dialog box ( silent )

If another copy of shmedia.dll exists in the system search path, regsvr32 may choose that copy instead of the one in the current directory. This problem can usually be solved by specifying a full path (e.g., c:\windows\system32\shmedia.dll) or using the following syntax:

regsvr32 .\shmedia.dll
