= Windows XP =

2001 Microsoft operating system version

- Version of the Windows NT operating system

- Screenshot of Windows XP running the Luna visual style, showing the start menu, taskbar, and My Computer window
- Developer: Microsoft
- Working state: No longer supported
- Source model: Closed-source; Source-available (through Shared Source Initiative)
- Released to manufacturing: August 24, 2001; 25 years ago
- General availability: October 25, 2001; 25 years ago
- Final release: Service Pack 3 with May 2019 security update (5.1.2600.7701) / May 14, 2019; 7 years ago
- Marketing target: Consumer and Business
- Update method: Windows Update; Windows Server Update Services (WSUS); System Center Configuration Manager (SCCM)
- Supported platforms: IA-32, x86-64, Itanium
- Kernel type: Hybrid (NT)
- Userland: Windows API; NTVDM (IA-32 only); SFU
- License: Proprietary commercial software
- Preceded by: Windows 2000 (1999) (professional client); Windows Me (2000) (consumer client)
- Succeeded by: Windows Vista (2006)
- Official website: Windows XP (archived at Wayback Machine)
- Tagline: Yes you can

Support status
- Excludes Itanium and some embedded editions: Mainstream support ended on April 14, 2009. Extended support ended on April 8, 2014. Exceptions existed until May 14, 2019. (see § Support lifecycle for details)

Windows XP (stylized as Windows^{xp}) is a major release of Microsoft's Windows NT operating system. It was released to manufacturing on August 24, 2001, and later to retail on October 25 that year. It is a direct successor to Windows 2000 for high-end and business users and Windows Me for home users.

Development of Windows XP began in the late 1990s under the codename "Neptune", built on the Windows NT kernel, and explicitly intended for mainstream consumer use. An updated version of Windows 2000 was also initially planned for the business market. However, in January 2000, both projects were scrapped in favor of a single OS codenamed "Whistler", which would serve as a single platform for both consumer and business markets. As a result, Windows XP is the first consumer edition of Windows not based on the Windows 95 kernel or MS-DOS.

Upon its release, Windows XP received critical acclaim, noting increased performance and stability (especially compared to Windows Me), a more intuitive user interface, improved hardware support and expanded multimedia capabilities. Windows XP and Windows Server 2003 were succeeded by Windows Vista and Windows Server 2008, released in 2007 and 2008, respectively.

Mainstream support for Windows XP ended on April 14, 2009, and extended support ended on April 8, 2014. Embedded versions of Windows XP received support up until 2019, with Windows Embedded POSReady 2009, based on Windows XP Professional, being the last version to receive updates until April 2019. Unofficial methods were available to apply the updates from the embedded versions to other editions of Windows XP, however Microsoft has discouraged this practice, citing compatibility issues. All other security updates for Windows XP past the end-of-support date were released up until May 14, 2019.

== Development ==
In the late 1990s, initial development of what would become Windows XP was focused on two individual products: "Odyssey", which was reportedly intended to succeed the future Windows 2000, and "Neptune", which was reportedly a consumer-oriented operating system using the Windows NT architecture, succeeding the MS-DOS-based Windows 98.

However, the projects proved to be too ambitious. In January 2000, shortly before the official release of Windows 2000, technology writer Paul Thurrott reported that Microsoft had shelved both Neptune and Odyssey in favor of a new product codenamed "Whistler", named after Whistler, British Columbia, as many Microsoft employees skied at the Whistler-Blackcomb ski resort. The goal of Whistler was to unify both the consumer and business-oriented Windows lines under a single Windows NT platform. Thurrott stated that Neptune had become "a black hole when all the features that were cut from Windows Me were simply re-tagged as Neptune features. And since Neptune and Odyssey would be based on the same code base anyway, it made sense to combine them into a single project".

At PDC on July 13, 2000, Microsoft announced that Whistler would be released during the second half of 2001 and also unveiled the first preview build, 2250, which featured an early implementation of Windows XP's visual styles system and interface changes to Windows Explorer and the Control Panel.

Microsoft released the first public beta build of Whistler, build 2296, on October 31, 2000. Subsequent builds gradually introduced features that users of the release version of Windows XP would recognize, such as Internet Explorer 6.0, the Microsoft Product Activation system, and the Bliss desktop background.

Whistler was officially unveiled during a media event on February 5, 2001, under the name Windows XP, where XP stands for "experience".

=== Release ===
In June 2001, Microsoft indicated that it was planning to spend at least US$1 billion on marketing and promoting Windows XP, in conjunction with Intel and other PC makers. The theme of the campaign, "Yes You Can", was designed to emphasize the platform's overall capabilities. Microsoft had originally planned to use the slogan "Prepare to Fly", but it was replaced because of sensitivity issues in the wake of the September 11 attacks.

On August 24, 2001, Windows XP build 2600 was released to manufacturing (RTM). During a ceremonial media event at Microsoft Redmond Campus, copies of the RTM build were given to representatives of several major PC manufacturers in briefcases, who then flew off on decorated helicopters. While PC manufacturers would be able to release devices running XP beginning on September 24, 2001, XP was expected to reach general retail availability on October 25, 2001. On the same day, Microsoft also announced the final retail pricing of XP's two main editions, "Home" (as a replacement for Windows Me for home computing) and "Professional" (as a replacement for Windows 2000 for high-end users).

== New and updated features ==
=== User interface ===
Updated start menu in the Media Center Edition-exclusive Royale theme, now featuring two columns

While retaining some similarities to previous versions, Windows XP's interface was overhauled with a new visual appearance, with an increased use of alpha compositing effects, drop shadows, and "visual styles", which completely changed the appearance of the operating system. The number of effects enabled is determined by the operating system based on the computer's processing power, and can be enabled or disabled on a case-by-case basis. XP also added ClearType, a new subpixel rendering system designed to improve the appearance of fonts on liquid-crystal displays. A new set of system icons was also introduced. The default wallpaper, Bliss, is a photo of a landscape in the Napa Valley outside Napa, California, with rolling green hills and a blue sky with stratocumulus and cirrus clouds.

The Start menu received its first major overhaul in XP, switching to a two-column layout with the ability to list, pin, and display frequently used applications, recently opened documents, and the traditional cascading "All Programs" menu. The taskbar can now group windows opened by a single application into one taskbar button, with a popup menu listing the individual windows. The notification area also hides "inactive" icons by default. A "common tasks" list was added, and Windows Explorer's sidebar was updated to use a new task-based design with lists of common actions; the tasks displayed are contextually relevant to the type of content in a folder (e.g. a folder with music displays offers to play all the files in the folder, or burn them to a CD).

The "task grouping" feature introduced in Windows XP showing both grouped and individual items

Fast user switching allows additional users to log into a Windows XP machine without existing users having to close their programs and log out. Although only one user at the time can use the console (i.e., monitor, keyboard, and mouse), previous users can resume their session once they regain control of the console. Service Pack 2 and Service Pack 3 also introduced new features to Windows XP post-release, including the Windows Security Center, Bluetooth support, Data Execution Prevention, Windows Firewall, and support for SDHC cards that are larger than 4 GB and up to 32 GB.

=== Infrastructure ===
Windows XP uses prefetching to improve startup and application launch times. It also became possible to revert the installation of an updated device driver, should the updated driver produce undesirable results.

A copy protection system known as Windows Product Activation was introduced with Windows XP and its server counterpart, Windows Server 2003. All non-enterprise (Volume Licensing) Windows licenses must be tied to a unique ID generated using information from the computer hardware, transmitted either via the internet or a telephone hotline. If Windows is not activated within 30 days of installation, the OS will cease to function until it is activated. Windows also periodically verifies the hardware to check for changes. If significant hardware changes are detected, the activation is voided, and Windows must be re-activated.

=== Networking and internet functionality ===
Windows XP was originally bundled with Internet Explorer 6, Outlook Express 6, Windows Messenger, and MSN Explorer. New networking features were also added, including Internet Connection Firewall, Internet Connection Sharing integration with UPnP, NAT traversal APIs, Quality of Service features, IPv6 and Teredo tunneling, Background Intelligent Transfer Service, extended fax features, network bridging, peer to peer networking, support for most DSL modems, IEEE 802.11 (Wi-Fi) connections with auto configuration and roaming, TAPI 3.1, and networking over FireWire. Remote Assistance and Remote Desktop were also added, which allow users to connect to a computer running Windows XP from across a network or the Internet and access their applications, files, printers, and devices or request help. Improvements were also made to IntelliMirror features such as Offline Files, roaming user profiles, and folder redirection.

=== Backward compatibility ===
To enable running software that targets or locks out specific versions of Windows, "Compatibility mode" was added. It allows pretending a selected earlier version of Windows to software, starting at Windows 95. This feature was first introduced in Windows 2000 Service Pack 2 five months before Windows XP's release, being backported from pre-release Windows XP builds. This implementation is hidden by default and must be activated by the Register Server utility, and only offers it to users under the Administrators group. It also has fewer options for compatibility settings. Windows XP came with a complete, finalized version of the one from Windows 2000 Service Pack 2, being included out-of-the-box without requiring any manual activation, and also grants access to regular users.

=== Other features ===
- Improved application compatibility and shims compared to Windows 2000.
- DirectX 8.1, upgradeable to DirectX 9.0c.
- A number of new features in Windows Explorer including task panes, thumbnails, and the option to view photos as a slideshow.
- Improved imaging features such as Windows Picture and Fax Viewer.
- Faster start-up, (because of improved Prefetch functions) logon, logoff, hibernation, and application launch sequences.
- Numerous improvements to increase the system reliability such as improved System Restore, Automated System Recovery, and driver reliability improvements through Device Driver Rollback.
- Hardware support improvements such as FireWire 800, and improvements to multi-monitor support under the name "DualView".
- Fast user switching.
- The ClearType font rendering mechanism, which is designed to improve text readability on liquid-crystal display (LCD) and similar monitors, especially laptops.
- Side-by-side assemblies and registration-free COM.
- General improvements to international support such as more locales, languages and scripts, MUI support in Terminal Services, improved Input Method Editors, and National Language Support.

== Removed features ==
Some of the programs and features that were part of the previous versions of Windows did not make it to Windows XP. Various MS-DOS commands available in its Windows 9x predecessor were removed, as were the POSIX and OS/2 environment subsystems.

In networking, NetBEUI, NWLink and NetDDE were deprecated and not installed by default. Plug-and-play–incompatible communication devices (like modems and network interface cards) were no longer supported.

Later service packs from Service Pack 2 onwards would gradually remove features from Windows XP, such as support for TCP half-open connections, Program Manager and the Address bar toolbar option on the taskbar. The boot screens for all editions of Windows XP have also been unified by Service Pack 2 onwards, where the blue progress bar is used for all editions including Home Edition (which previously used a green progress bar in Service Pack 1 and prior) and the SKU and copyright years on the boot screen were removed.

== Editions ==
Diagram representing the main editions of Windows XP. It is based on the category of the edition (grey) and codebase (black arrow).

Windows XP was released in two major editions on launch: Home Edition and Professional. Both editions were made available at retail as pre-loaded software on new computers and as boxed copies. Boxed copies were sold as "Upgrade" or "Full" licenses; the "Upgrade" versions were slightly cheaper, but require an existing version of Windows to install. The "Full" version can be installed on systems without an operating system or existing version of Windows. The two editions of XP were aimed at different markets: Home Edition is explicitly intended for consumer use and disables or removes certain advanced and enterprise-oriented features present on Professional, such as the ability to join a Windows domain, Internet Information Services, and Multilingual User Interface. Windows 98 or Me can be upgraded to either Home Edition or Professional and Windows NT 4.0 or 2000 can only be upgraded to Professional. Windows' software license agreement for pre-loaded licenses allows the software to be "returned" to the OEM for a refund if the user does not wish to use it. Despite the refusal of some manufacturers to honor the entitlement, it has been enforced by courts in some countries.

Two specialized variants of XP were introduced in 2002 for certain types of hardware, exclusively through OEM channels as pre-loaded software. Windows XP Media Center Edition was initially designed for high-end home theater PCs with TV tuners (marketed under the term "Media Center PC"), offering expanded multimedia functionality, an electronic program guide, and digital video recorder (DVR) support through the Windows Media Center application. Microsoft also unveiled Windows XP Tablet PC Edition, which contains additional pen input features, and is optimized for mobile devices meeting its Tablet PC specifications. Two different 64-bit editions of XP were made available. The first, Windows XP 64-Bit Edition, was intended for IA-64 (Itanium) systems; as IA-64 usage declined on workstations in favor of AMD's x86-64 architecture, the Itanium edition was discontinued in January 2005. A new 64-bit edition supporting the x86-64 architecture, called Windows XP Professional x64 Edition, was released in April 2005.

Microsoft also targeted emerging markets with the 2004 introduction of Windows XP Starter Edition, a special variant of Home Edition intended for low-cost PCs. The OS is primarily aimed at first-time computer owners, containing heavy localization (including wallpapers and screen savers incorporating images of local landmarks), and a "My Support" area which contains video tutorials on basic computing tasks. It also removes certain "complex" features, and does not allow users to run more than three applications at a time. After a pilot program in India and Thailand, Starter was released in other emerging markets throughout 2005. In 2006, Microsoft also unveiled the FlexGo initiative, which would also target emerging markets with subsidized PCs on a pre-paid, subscription basis.

As a result of unfair competition lawsuits in Europe and South Korea, which both alleged that Microsoft had improperly leveraged its status in the PC market to favor its own bundled software, Microsoft was ordered to release special editions of XP in these markets that excluded certain applications. In March 2004, after the European Commission fined Microsoft €497 million (US$603 million), Microsoft was ordered to release "N" editions of XP that excluded Windows Media Player, encouraging users to pick and download their own media player software. As it was sold at the same price as the edition with Windows Media Player included, certain OEMs (such as Dell, who offered it for a short period, along with Hewlett-Packard, Lenovo and Fujitsu Siemens) chose not to offer it. Consumer interest was minuscule, with roughly 1,500 units shipped to OEMs, and no reported sales to consumers. In December 2005, the Korean Fair Trade Commission ordered Microsoft to make available editions of Windows XP and Windows Server 2003 that do not contain Windows Media Player or Windows Messenger. The "K" and "KN" editions of Windows XP were released in August 2006, and are only available in English and Korean, and also contain links to third-party instant messenger and media player software.

== Service packs ==
A service pack is a cumulative update package that is a superset of all updates, and even service packs that have been released before it. Three service packs have been released for Windows XP. Service Pack 3 is slightly different, in that it needs at least Service Pack 1 to have been installed, in order to update a live OS. However, Service Pack 3 can still be embedded into a Windows installation disc; SP1 is not reported as a prerequisite for doing so.

=== Service Pack 1 ===
Service Pack 1 (SP1) for Windows XP was released on September 9, 2002. It contained over 300 minor, post-RTM bug fixes, along with all security patches released since the original release of XP. SP1 also added USB 2.0 support, the Microsoft Java Virtual Machine, .NET Framework support, and support for technologies used by the then-upcoming Media Center and Tablet PC editions of XP. The most significant change on SP1 was the addition of Set Program Access and Defaults, a settings page which allows programs to be set as default for certain types of activities (such as media players or web browsers) and for access to bundled, Microsoft programs (such as Internet Explorer or Windows Media Player) to be disabled. This feature was added to comply with the settlement of United States v. Microsoft Corp., which required Microsoft to offer the ability for OEMs to bundle third-party competitors to software it bundles with Windows (such as Internet Explorer and Windows Media Player), and give them the same level of prominence as those normally bundled with the OS.

On February 3, 2003, Microsoft released Service Pack 1a (SP1a). It was the same as SP1, except the Microsoft Java Virtual Machine was excluded.

Windows XP Service Pack 1 was later included in Windows XP Tablet PC Edition and Windows XP Media Center Edition.

=== Service Pack 2 ===
Windows Security Center window running Windows XP Service Pack 2, showing no virus protection installed

Service Pack 2 (SP2) for Windows XP Home edition and Professional edition was released on August 25, 2004. Headline features included WPA encryption compatibility for Wi-Fi and usability improvements to the Wi-Fi networking user interface, partial Bluetooth support, and various improvements to security systems.

Headed by former computer hacker Window Snyder, the service pack's security improvements (codenamed "Springboard", as these features were intended to underpin additional changes in Longhorn) included a major revision to the included firewall (renamed Windows Firewall, and now enabled by default), and an update to Data Execution Prevention, which gained hardware support in the NX bit that can stop some forms of buffer overflow attacks. Raw socket support is removed (which supposedly limits the damage done by zombie machines) and the Windows Messenger service (which had been abused to cause pop-up advertisements to be displayed as system messages without a web browser or any additional software) became disabled by default. Additionally, security-related improvements were made to e-mail and web browsing. Service Pack 2 also added Security Center, an interface that provides a general overview of the system's security status, including the state of the firewall and automatic updates. Third-party firewall and antivirus software can also be monitored from Security Center.

In August 2006, Microsoft released updated installation media for Windows XP and Windows Server 2003 SP2 (SP2b), in order to incorporate a patch requiring ActiveX controls in Internet Explorer to be manually activated before a user may interact with them. This was done so that the browser would not violate a patent owned by Eolas. Microsoft has since licensed the patent, and released a patch reverting the change in April 2008. In September 2007, another minor revision known as SP2c was released for XP Professional, extending the number of available product keys for the operating system to "support the continued availability of Windows XP Professional through the scheduled system builder channel end-of-life (EOL) date of January 31, 2009."

Windows XP Service Pack 2 was later included in Windows XP Starter Edition, Windows XP Tablet PC Edition 2005, Windows XP Media Center Edition 2005, Windows Embedded for Point of Service and Windows Fundamentals for Legacy PCs.

=== Service Pack 3 ===
The third and final Service Pack, SP3, was released through different channels between April 29 and June 10, 2008, about a year after the release of Windows Vista, and about a year before the release of Windows 7. Service Pack 3 was not available for Windows XP x64 Edition, which was based on the Windows Server 2003 kernel and, as a result, used its service packs rather than the ones for the other editions.

It began being automatically pushed out to Automatic Updates users on July 10, 2008. A feature set overview which detailed new features available separately as stand-alone updates to Windows XP, as well as backported features from Windows Vista, was posted by Microsoft. A total of 1,174 fixes are included in SP3. Service Pack 3 could be installed on systems with Internet Explorer up to and including version 8; Internet Explorer 7 was not included as part of SP3. It also did not include Internet Explorer 8, which was included in Windows 7, which was released one year after XP SP3.

Service Pack 3 included security enhancements from those of SP2, including APIs allowing developers to enable Data Execution Prevention for their code, independent of system-wide compatibility enforcement settings, the Security Support Provider Interface, improvements to WPA2 security, and an updated version of the Microsoft Enhanced Cryptographic Provider Module that is FIPS 140-2 certified.

In incorporating all previously released updates not included in SP2, Service Pack 3 included many other key features. Windows Imaging Component allowed camera vendors to integrate their own proprietary image codecs with the operating system's features, such as thumbnails and slideshows. In enterprise features, Remote Desktop Protocol 6.1 included support for ClearType and 32-bit color depth over RDP, while improvements made to Windows Management Instrumentation in Windows Vista to reduce the possibility of corruption of the WMI repository were backported to XP SP3.

In addition, SP3 contains updates to the operating system components of Windows XP Media Center Edition (MCE) and Windows XP Tablet PC Edition, and security updates for .NET Framework version 1.0, which is included in these editions. However, it does not include update rollups for the Windows Media Center application in Windows XP MCE 2005. SP3 also omits security updates for Windows Media Player 10, although the player is included in Windows XP MCE 2005. The Address Bar DeskBand on the Taskbar is no longer included because of antitrust violation concerns.

Unofficial SP3 ZIP download packages were released on a now-defunct website called The Hotfix from 2005 to 2007. The owner of the website, Ethan C. Allen, was a former Microsoft employee in Software Quality Assurance and would comb through the Microsoft Knowledge Base articles daily and download new hotfixes Microsoft would put online within the articles. The articles would have a "kbwinxppresp3fix" and/or "kbwinxpsp3fix" tag, thus allowing Allen to easily find and determine which fixes were planned for the official SP3 release to come. Microsoft publicly stated at the time that the SP3 pack was unofficial and advised users to not install it. Allen also released a Vista SP1 package in 2007, for which Allen received a cease-and-desist email from Microsoft.

Windows XP Service Pack 3 was later included in Windows Embedded Standard 2009 and Windows Embedded POSReady 2009.

== System requirements ==
System requirements for Windows XP are as follows:

System requirements
Requirement	Minimum	Recommended
Home/Professional Edition
CPU	Pentium or compatible, 233 MHz (Note: Even though this is Microsoft's stated minimum processor speed for Windows XP, it is possible to install and run the operating system on early IA-32 processors such as a P5 Pentium without MMX instructions. Windows XP is not compatible with processors older than Pentium (such as 486) or the Cyrix 6x86 because it requires the CMPXCHG8B instruction.); BIOS or compatible firmware	Pentium or compatible, 300 MHz; BIOS or compatible firmware
Memory	64 MB (Note: A Microsoft TechNet paper from Summer 2001 (before Windows XP's actual release), states that: "A computer with 64 MB of RAM will have sufficient resources to run Windows XP and a few applications with moderate memory requirements." (Emphasis added.) These were said to be office productivity applications, e-mail programs, and web browsers (of the time). With such a configuration, user interface enhancements and fast user switching are turned off by default. For comparable workloads, 64 MB of RAM was then regarded as providing an equal or better user experience on Windows XP with similar settings than it would with Windows Me on the same hardware. In a later section of the paper, superior performance over Windows Me was noted with 128 MB of RAM or more, and with computers that exceed the minimum hardware requirements.)	128 MB
Free space	1.5 GB; Master boot record used	2.15 GB for Service Pack 1 and 1a; 3.95 GB for Service Pack 2; 4.83 GB for Service Pack 3
Media	CD-ROM drive or compatible	
Display	Super VGA (800 × 600) or over	XGA (1024 × 768) or over
Sound hardware	N/A	Sound card plus speakers/headphones
Input device(s)	Keyboard, mouse	
Professional x64 Edition
CPU	x86-64 or compatible; BIOS or compatible firmware	
Memory	256 MB	
Free space	1.5 GB; Master boot record used	
Media	CD-ROM drive or compatible	
Display	Super VGA (800 × 600) or over	XGA (1024 × 768) or over
Sound hardware	N/A	Sound card plus speakers/headphones
Input device(s)	Keyboard, mouse	
64-Bit Edition
CPU	Itanium 733 MHz	Itanium 800 MHz
Memory	1 GB	
Free space	6 GB	
Media	CD-ROM drive or compatible	
Display	Super VGA (800 × 600) or over	XGA (1024 x 768) or over
Input device(s)	Keyboard, mouse	

=== Physical memory limits ===
The maximum amount of RAM that Windows XP can support varies depending on the product edition and the processor architecture. All 32-bit editions of XP support up to 4 GB, except the Windows XP Starter edition, which supports up to 512 MB of RAM. The 64-bit editions support up to 128 GB.

=== Processor limits ===
Maximum number of physical processors that Windows XP supports is: 1 for Starter Edition, Home Edition, Media Center Edition, and Tablet PC Edition; and 2 for Professional.

Maximum number of logical processors (Note: A logical processor is either: One of the cores on one of the physical processors without SMT; or one of the two threads handled by one of the cores on one of the physical processors with SMT.) that Windows XP supports is: 32 for 32-bit (x86-32) and 64 for 64-bit (x86-64).

== Upgradeability ==
Several Windows XP components are upgradable to the latest versions, which include new versions introduced in later versions of Windows, and other major Microsoft applications are available. These latest versions for Windows XP include:

- ActiveSync 4.5
- DirectX 9.0c (June 7, 2010, Redistributable)
- Internet Explorer 8
- Windows Media Format Runtime and Windows Media Player 11
- Microsoft Virtual PC 2007 SP1
- .NET Framework 4.0
- Visual Studio 2010
- Windows Script Host 5.7
- Windows Installer 4.5
- Microsoft NetMeeting 3.02
- Windows Sidebar
- Windows Defender
- Office 2010 SP2
- The Windows Services for UNIX subsystem can be installed to allow certain Unix-based applications to run on the operating system.

== Support lifecycle ==
Support status summary
Expiration date
- Mainstream support: April 14, 2009
- Extended support: April 8, 2014; The official exceptions ended in May 14, 2019.

Applicable XP editions:
- Home Edition, Professional Edition, Professional x64 Edition, Professional for Embedded Systems, Media Center Editions (all), Starter Edition, Tablet PC Edition and Tablet PC Edition 2005, as well as Windows Fundamentals for Legacy PCs.

Exceptions
- Windows XP 64-Bit Edition (Itanium edition, including Version 2003): Unsupported as of June 30, 2005
- Windows XP Embedded: Mainstream support ended on January 11, 2011; Extended support ended on January 12, 2016
- Windows Embedded for Point of Service: Mainstream support ended on April 12, 2011; Extended support ended on April 12, 2016
- Windows Embedded Standard 2009: Mainstream support ended on January 14, 2014; Extended support ended on January 8, 2019
- Windows Embedded POSReady 2009: Mainstream support ended on April 8, 2014; Extended support ended on April 9, 2019

Support for the original release of Windows XP (without a service pack) ended on August 30, 2005. Both Windows XP Service Pack 1 and 1a were retired on October 10, 2006, and both Windows 2000 and Windows XP SP2 reached their end of support on July 13, 2010, about 24 months after the launch of Windows XP Service Pack 3. The company stopped general licensing of Windows XP to OEMs and terminated retail sales of the operating system on June 30, 2008, 17 months after the release of Windows Vista. However, an exception was announced on April 3, 2008, for OEMs producing what it defined as "ultra low-cost personal computers", particularly netbooks, until one year after the availability of Windows 7 on October 22, 2009. Analysts felt that the move was primarily intended to compete against Linux-based netbooks, although Microsoft's Kevin Hutz stated that the decision was due to apparent market demand for low-end computers with Windows.

Variants of Windows XP for embedded systems have different support policies: Windows XP Embedded SP3 and Windows Embedded for Point of Service SP3 were supported until January and April 2016, respectively. Windows Embedded Standard 2009, which was succeeded by Windows Embedded Standard 7, and Windows Embedded POSReady 2009, which was succeeded by Windows Embedded POSReady 7, were supported until January and April 2019, respectively. These updates, while intended for the embedded editions, could also be downloaded on standard Windows XP with a registry hack, which enabled unofficial patches until April 2019. However, Microsoft advised Windows XP users against installing these fixes, citing compatibility issues.

=== End of support ===
On April 14, 2009, the main Windows XP exited mainstream support and entered the extended support phase; Microsoft continued to provide security updates every month for Windows XP, however, free technical support, warranty claims, and design changes were no longer being offered. Extended support for the main version ended on April 8, 2014, over 12 years after the release of Windows XP; normally Microsoft products have a support life cycle of only 10 years. Beyond the final security updates released on April 8 for the main version, no more security patches or support information are provided for XP free-of-charge; "critical patches" will still be created, and made available only to customers subscribing to a paid "Custom Support" plan. As it is a Windows component, all versions of Internet Explorer for Windows XP also became unsupported.

In January 2014, it was estimated that more than 95% of the 3 million automated teller machines in the world were still running Windows XP (which largely replaced IBM's OS/2 as the predominant operating system on ATMs); ATMs have an average lifecycle of between seven and ten years, but some have had lifecycles as long as 15. Plans were being made by several ATM vendors and their customers to migrate to Windows 7-based systems over the course of 2014, while vendors have also considered the possibility of using Linux-based platforms in the future to give them more flexibility for support lifecycles, and the ATM Industry Association (ATMIA) has since endorsed Windows 10 as a further replacement. However, ATMs typically run the embedded variant of Windows XP, which was supported through January 2016. As of May 2017, around 60% of the 220,000 ATMs in India still run Windows XP.

Furthermore, at least 49% of all computers in China still ran XP at the beginning of 2014. These holdouts were influenced by several factors; prices of genuine copies of later versions of Windows in the country are high, while Ni Guangnan of the Chinese Academy of Sciences warned that Windows 8 could allegedly expose users to surveillance by the United States government, and the Chinese government banned the purchase of Windows 8 products for government use in May 2014 in protest of Microsoft's inability to provide "guaranteed" support. The government also had concerns that the impending end of support could affect their anti-piracy initiatives with Microsoft, as users would simply pirate newer versions rather than purchasing them legally. As such, government officials formally requested that Microsoft extend the support period for XP for these reasons. While Microsoft did not comply with their requests, a number of major Chinese software developers, such as Lenovo, Kingsoft and Tencent, will provide free support and resources for Chinese users migrating from XP. Several governments, in particular those of the Netherlands and the United Kingdom, elected to negotiate "Custom Support" plans with Microsoft for their continued, internal use of Windows XP; the British government's deal lasted for a year, and also covered support for Office 2003 (which reached end-of-life the same day) and cost £5.5 million.

On March 8, 2014, Microsoft deployed an update for XP that, on the 8th of each month, displays a pop-up notification to remind users about the end of support; however, these notifications may be disabled by the user. Microsoft also partnered with Laplink to provide a special "express" version of its PCmover software to help users migrate files and settings from XP to a computer with a newer version of Windows.

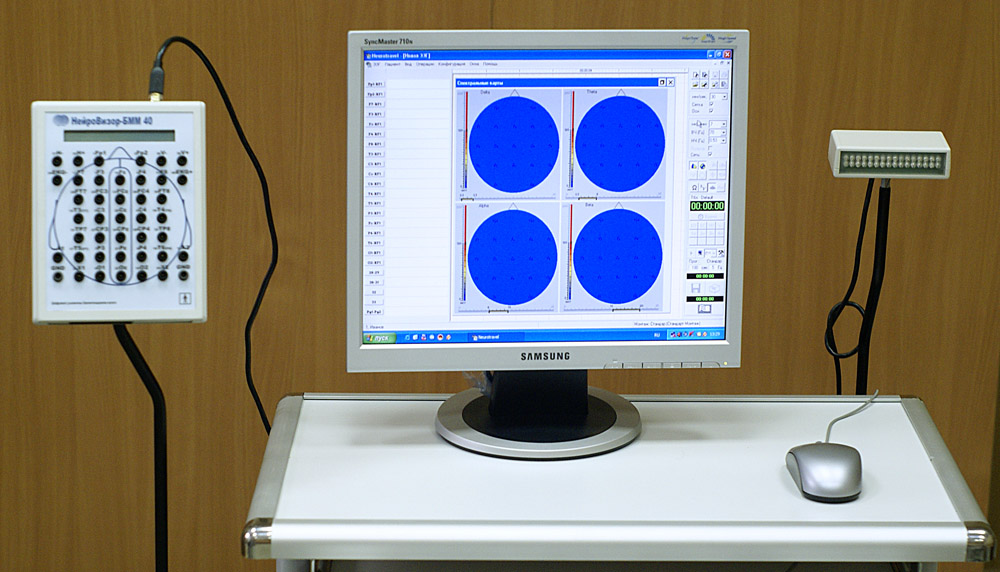
An electroencephalograph running on Windows XP. The medical industry's continued use of Windows XP is partly due to medical applications being incompatible with later versions of Windows.

Despite the approaching end of support of the main version, there were still notable holdouts that had not migrated past XP; many users elected to remain on XP because of the poor reception of Windows Vista, sales of newer PCs with newer versions of Windows declined because of the Great Recession and the effects of Vista, and deployments of new versions of Windows in enterprise environments require a large amount of planning, which includes testing applications for compatibility (especially those that are dependent on Internet Explorer 6, which is not compatible with newer versions of Windows). Major security software vendors (including Microsoft itself) planned to continue offering support and definitions for Windows XP past the end of support to varying extents, along with the developers of Google Chrome, Mozilla Firefox, and Opera web browsers; despite these measures, critics similarly argued that users should eventually migrate from XP to a supported platform.

The United States' Computer Emergency Readiness Team released an alert in March 2014 advising users of the impending end of support, and informing them that using XP after April 8 may prevent them from meeting US government information security requirements. Microsoft continued to provide Security Essentials virus definitions and updates for its Malicious Software Removal Tool (MSRT) for XP until July 14, 2015. As the end of extended support approached, Microsoft began to increasingly urge XP customers to migrate to newer versions such as Windows 7 or 8 in the interest of security, suggesting that attackers could reverse engineer security patches for newer versions of Windows and use them to target equivalent vulnerabilities in XP. Windows XP is remotely exploitable by numerous security holes that were discovered after Microsoft stopped supporting it.

Similarly, specialized devices that run XP, particularly medical devices, must have any revisions to their software—even security updates for the underlying operating system—approved by relevant regulators before they can be released. For this reason, manufacturers often did not allow any updates to devices' operating systems, leaving them open to security exploits and malware.

Despite the end of support of the main version, Microsoft has released three emergency security updates for the operating system to patch major security vulnerabilities:

- A patch released in May 2014 to address recently discovered vulnerabilities in Internet Explorer 6 through 11 on all versions of Windows.
- A patch released in May 2017 to address a vulnerability that was being leveraged by the WannaCry ransomware attack.
- A patch released in May 2019 to address a critical code execution vulnerability in Remote Desktop Services which can be exploited in a similar way as the WannaCry vulnerability.

Researchers reported in August 2019 that Windows 10 users may be at risk for "critical" system compromise because of design flaws of hardware device drivers from multiple providers. In the same month, computer experts reported that the BlueKeep security vulnerability, CVE-2019-0708, that potentially affects older unpatched Microsoft Windows versions via the program's Remote Desktop Protocol, allowing for the possibility of remote code execution, may now include related flaws, collectively named DejaBlue, affecting newer Windows versions (i.e., Windows 7 and all recent versions) as well. In addition, experts reported a Microsoft security vulnerability, CVE-2019-1162, based on legacy code involving Microsoft CTF and ctfmon (ctfmon.exe), that affects all Windows versions from the older Windows XP version to the most recent Windows 10 versions; a patch to correct the flaw is currently available.

Microsoft announced in July 2019 that the Microsoft Internet Games services on Windows XP and Windows Me would end on July 31, 2019 (and for Windows 7 on January 22, 2020).

In 2020, Microsoft announced that it would disable the Windows Update service for SHA-1 endpoints for older Windows versions. Since Windows XP did not get an update for SHA-2, Windows Update Services are no longer available on the OS as of late July 2020. As of January 2026, many of the old updates for Windows XP are available on the Microsoft Update Catalog. Additionally, third-party services such as Legacy Update and Windows Update Restored allow users to install previously released updates on Windows XP. These services operate by routing update requests through alternative servers as well as utilizing modified versions of the Windows Update website, therefore negating the need for SHA-2 endpoint support.

=== Third-party support ===
In February 2016, Opera announced that version 36 of its web browser would be the last version of the web browser to support Windows XP and Windows Vista. Google Chrome ended support for Windows XP and Windows Vista in April 2016. Firefox 52 ESR (Extended Support Release), which was released in March 2017, was the last version to support Windows XP and Windows Vista. Support for Firefox 52 ESR ended in June 2018.

Blizzard Entertainment ended support for World of Warcraft, StarCraft II, Diablo III, Hearthstone, and Heroes of the Storm on Windows XP and Vista in October 2017. Steam ended support for Windows XP and Vista on January 1, 2019.

There are several unofficial web browser projects that maintain support for Windows XP, well after official web browsers dropped support for the operating system. Supermium, a fork of the Chromium project that Google Chrome is based on, is maintained for Windows XP and later unsupported versions of Windows as of 2026. MyPal, a fork of Firefox 68, is also being actively maintained for Windows XP.

End of support date for Windows XP versions
Version	Released	Standard support	Extended support
Original Release	October 25, 2001	August 30, 2005	April 8, 2014
Service Pack 1	September 9, 2002	October 10, 2006	April 8, 2014
Service Pack 1a	February 3, 2003	October 10, 2006	April 8, 2014
Service Pack 2	August 25, 2004	July 13, 2010	April 8, 2014
Service Pack 3	April 29, 2008	April 8, 2014	April 8, 2014

== Reception ==
On release, Windows XP received critical acclaim. CNET described the operating system as being "worth the hype", considering the new interface to be "spiffier" and more intuitive than previous versions, but feeling that it may "annoy" experienced users with its "hand-holding". XP's expanded multimedia support and CD burning functionality were also noted, along with its streamlined networking tools. The performance improvements of XP in comparison to 2000 and Me were also praised, along with its increased number of built-in device drivers in comparison to 2000. The software compatibility tools were also praised, although it was noted that some programs, particularly older MS-DOS software, may not work correctly on XP because of its differing architecture. They panned Windows XP's new licensing model and product activation system, considering it to be a "slightly annoying roadblock", but acknowledged Microsoft's intent for the changes. PC Magazine provided similar praise, although noting that a number of its online features were designed to promote Microsoft-owned services, and that aside from quicker boot times, XP's overall performance showed little difference over Windows 2000. AllGame said that "[...] XP is faster and far more stable than any previous home version of Windows." Windows XP's default theme, Luna, was criticized by some users for its childish look.

Despite extended support for the main Windows XP ending in 2014, many users – including some enterprises – were reluctant to move away from an operating system they viewed as a stable known quantity despite the many security and functionality improvements in subsequent releases of Windows. Windows XP's longevity was viewed as testament to its stability and Microsoft's successful attempts to keep it up to date, but also as an indictment of its direct successor's perceived failings.

=== Market share ===
According to web analytics data generated by Net Applications, Windows XP was the most widely used operating system until August 2012, when Windows 7 overtook it (later overtaken by Windows 10), while StatCounter indicates it happening almost a year earlier. In January 2014, Net Applications reported a market share of 29.23% of "desktop operating systems" for XP (when XP was introduced there was not a separate mobile category to track), while W3Schools reported a share of 11.0%.

As of September 2022, in most regions or continents, Windows XP market share on PCs, as a fraction of the total Windows share, had gone below 1% (0.5% in Africa). Windows XP allegedly retains a double-digit market share in a few countries such as Armenia, where 72% of Windows PCs in the country are still using Windows XP as of July 2025.

== Source code leak ==
On September 23, 2020, source code for Windows XP with Service Pack 1 and Windows Server 2003 was leaked onto the imageboard 4chan by an unknown user. Anonymous users managed to compile the code, as well as a Twitter user who posted videos of the process on YouTube proving that the code was genuine. The videos were later removed on copyright grounds by Microsoft. The leak was incomplete as it was missing Winlogon and some other components. The original leak itself was spread using magnet links and torrent files whose payload originally included Server 2003 and XP source code and which was later updated with additional files, among which were previous leaks of Microsoft products, its patents, media about conspiracy theories on Bill Gates by anti-vaccination movements and an assortment of PDF files on different topics.

Microsoft issued a statement stating that it was investigating the leaks.

== See also ==
- BlueKeep (security vulnerability)
- Comparison of operating systems
- History of operating systems
- List of operating systems
