= Windows 10 editions =

Windows 10 has several editions, all with varying feature sets, use cases, or intended devices. Certain editions are distributed only on devices directly from an original equipment manufacturer (OEM), while editions such as Enterprise and Education are only available through volume licensing channels. Microsoft also makes editions of Windows 10 available to device manufacturers for use on specific classes of devices, including IoT devices, and previously marketed Windows 10 Mobile for smartphones.

== Base editions ==
Baseline editions are the only editions available as standalone purchases in retail outlets. PCs often come pre-installed with one of these editions.

Home
Windows 10 Home is designed for use in PCs, tablets and 2-in-1 PCs. It includes all features directed at consumers.

Pro
Windows 10 Pro includes all features of Windows 10 Home, with additional capabilities that are oriented towards professionals and business environments, such as Active Directory, Remote Desktop, BitLocker, Hyper-V, and Windows Defender Device Guard. and additional features used by professionals like Windows Sandbox.

Pro for Workstations (Note: First introduced in Windows 10 Version 1709. Available in x64-64 only.)
Windows 10 Pro for Workstations is designed for high-end hardware for intensive computing tasks and supports Intel Xeon, AMD Opteron and Epyc processors; up to 4 CPUs; up to 256 cores; up to 6 TB RAM; the ReFS file system; Non-Volatile Dual In-line Memory Module (NVDIMM); and remote direct memory access (RDMA).

== Organizational editions ==
These editions add features to facilitate centralized control of many installations of the OS within an organization. The main avenue of acquiring them is a volume licensing contract with Microsoft.

Education
Windows 10 Education is distributed through Academic Volume Licensing. It was based on Windows 10 Enterprise and initially reported to have the same feature set. As of version 1709, however, this edition has fewer features. See § Comparison chart for details.
Pro Education
This edition was introduced in July 2016 for hardware partners on new devices purchased with the discounted K–12 academic license. It was based on the Pro edition of Windows 10 and contains mostly the same features as Windows 10 Pro with different options disabled by default, and adds options for setup and deployment in an education environment. It also features a "Set Up School PCs" app that allows provisioning of settings using a USB flash drive, and does not include Cortana, Microsoft Store suggestions, Windows Sandbox, or Windows Spotlight.
Enterprise
Windows 10 Enterprise provides all the features of Windows 10 Pro for Workstations, with additional features to assist with IT-based organizations. Windows 10 Enterprise is configurable on two servicing channels, Semi-Annual Channel and Windows Insider Program.
Enterprise LTSC
Enterprise LTSC (Long-Term Servicing Channel) is a long-term support variant of Windows 10 Enterprise, released every 2 to 3 years. Each release is supported with security updates for either 5 or 10 years after its release, and intentionally receives no feature updates. Some features, including the Microsoft Store and bundled apps, are not included in this edition. This edition was first released as Windows 10 Enterprise LTSB (Long-Term Servicing Branch). There are 4 releases of LTSC: one in 2015 (RTM), one in 2016 (version 1607), one in 2018 (labeled as 2019, version 1809), and one in 2021 (version 21H2).

=== Multi-session ===
Enterprise multi-session
Windows 10 Enterprise multi-session, a multi-session variant of Enterprise edition, included with Azure Virtual Desktop, allows multiple concurrent interactive sessions. Previously, only Windows Server could do this. A cloud-based alternative to an on-premise Remote Desktop Server (RDS), Azure Virtual Desktop is deployed in Azure Cloud as a virtual machine. License costs are already included in several Microsoft 365 subscriptions, including Microsoft 365 Business Premium or Microsoft 365 E3.

== S mode ==
Since 2018, OEMs can ship Windows 10 Home and Pro in a gatekeeping variant named S mode. Essentially, Microsoft discontinued Windows 10 S which restricted user to Microsoft Store apps only, and turned it into a mode. Among many blocked or limited features that Microsoft markets as security-oriented and aimed for use by schools, system settings are locked to allow only Microsoft Edge as the default web browser, itself locked to allow only Bing as its default search engine. Non-Microsoft web browsers such as Firefox can be installed, but are blocked from being set as default browsers. It does not allow to run Linux on it either. The installation of software (both Universal Windows Platform (UWP) and Windows API apps) is only possible through the Microsoft Store, and built-in and Microsoft Store-obtained command line programs or shells cannot be run in S mode. Critics have compared the S mode to Windows RT, and have suspected it to seek to compete with ChromeOS, which was confirmed by a leaked Microsoft document.

=== Changes ===
The operating system may be switched out of S mode using the Microsoft Store for free. Once S Mode is turned off, it cannot be re-enabled.

== Device-specific editions ==
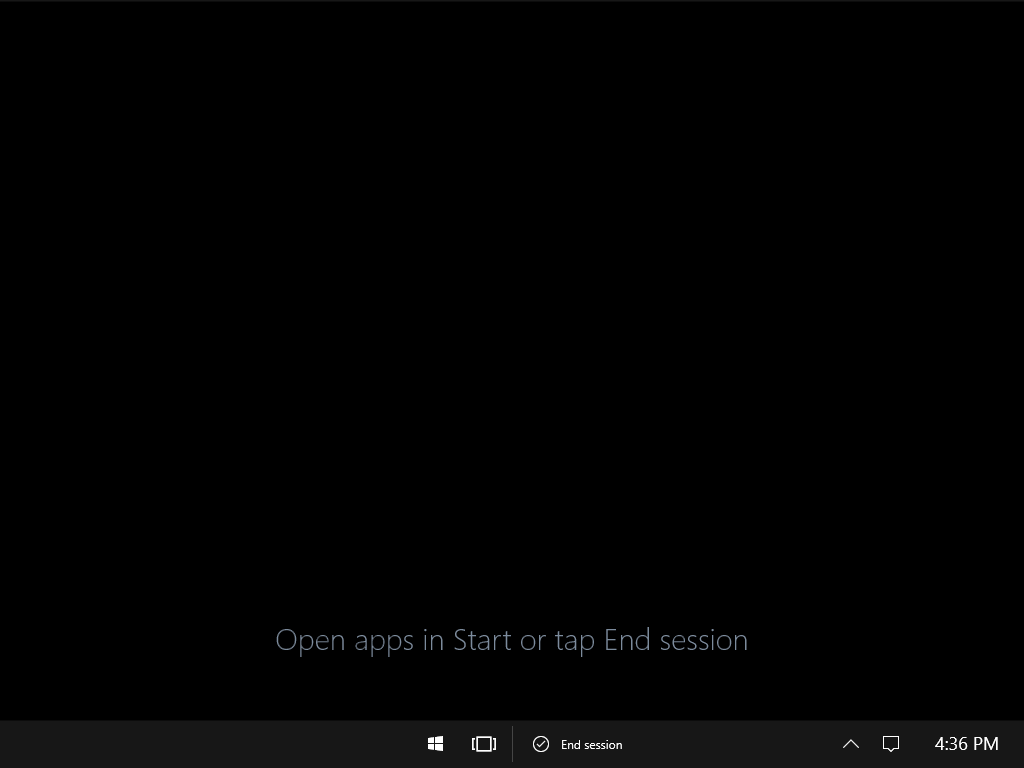
A desktop of Windows 10 Team

These editions are licensed to OEMs only, and are primarily obtained via the purchase of hardware that includes it:

Holographic
A specific edition used by Microsoft's HoloLens mixed reality smartglasses.

Team
A specific edition used by Microsoft's Surface Hub interactive whiteboard.

== IoT editions ==
Rebranded from Microsoft's earlier operating system editions in the Windows Embedded family. Binary identical to their non-IoT counterparts with version 1809 and older, while newer versions add support for smaller storage devices. Available via OEMs and volume licensing for specific versions.

IoT Enterprise
Intended specifically for use in small footprint, low-cost devices and IoT scenarios.

IoT Enterprise LTSC
Long-Term Servicing Channel variant. Replaces all IoT Core edition variants starting with the 2021 release. Furthermore, the 2021 release gains an extra 5 years of support compared to its non-IoT counterpart and is available via volume licensing for the first time.

== Discontinued editions ==
The following editions of Windows 10 were discontinued (as of Windows 10 version 21H2). For both Mobile and Mobile Enterprise, Microsoft confirmed it was exiting the consumer mobile devices market, so no successor product is available.

Mobile
Windows 10 Mobile was designed for smartphones and small tablets. It included all basic consumer features, including Continuum capability. It was the de facto successor of Windows Phone 8.1 and Windows RT.
Mobile Enterprise
Windows 10 Mobile Enterprise provided all of the features in Windows 10 Mobile, with additional features to assist IT-based organizations, in a manner similar to Windows 10 Enterprise, but optimized for mobile devices.
IoT Mobile
A binary equivalent of Windows 10 Mobile Enterprise licensed for IoT applications. Also known as IoT Mobile Enterprise.
IoT Core/IoT Core LTSC
Windows 10 IoT Core was optimized for smaller and lower-cost industry devices. It was also formerly provided free of charge for use in devices like the Raspberry Pi for hobbyist use. Only UWP apps are supported, and only one at a time at that. Discontinued after version 1809. Support ended on 10 November 2020 for non-LTSC, while IoT Core LTSC (2019/version 1809) support will continue until 9 January 2029. Merged into and replaced by IoT Enterprise LTSC starting with the 2021/version 21H2 release.
S
Windows 10 S was an edition released in 2017 which ultimately evolved into the so-called S mode of Windows 10. In March 2018, Microsoft announced that it would be phasing out Windows 10 S, citing confusion among manufacturers and end-users.
Lean
Lean was meant to be used for cheaper desktops and laptops with a small storage capacity and resources, it could fit even on a 16 GB hard drive; only one build was released in 2018, the setup identifies the edition as "Windows 10 Lean".
Andromeda
Andromeda was demonstrated on the Lumia 950. The project was canceled for unknown reasons.
10X

Originally announced for use on dual-screen devices such as the Surface Neo and other potential form factors, 10X featured a modified user interface designed around context specific interactions or "postures" on such devices, including a redesigned Start menu with no tiles, and use of container technology to run Win32 software. The platform was described as a more direct competitor to ChromeOS. On May 4, 2020, Microsoft announced that Windows 10X would first be used on single-screen devices, and that they would "continue to look for the right moment, in conjunction with our OEM partners, to bring dual-screen devices to market". Microsoft also added anti-theft protection to Windows 10X, just like how Apple's Activation Lock and anti-theft protection on Android devices and Chromebooks work. On May 18, 2021, Head of Windows Servicing and Delivery John Cable stated that Windows 10X had been cancelled, and that its foundational technologies would be leveraged for future Microsoft products. Several design changes in 10X, notably the centered taskbar and redesigned start menu, would be later introduced in Windows 11.

== Regional variations ==
N/KN
As with previous versions of Windows since Windows XP, all Windows 10 editions for PC hardware have "N" and "KN" variations in Europe and South Korea respectively that exclude multimedia functionality, in compliance with antitrust rulings. According to details that Microsoft has published, any app that relies on Microsoft multimedia technologies experiences impaired functionality on these editions, unable to even play audio notification tones. Restoring the missing functionality to these editions entails installing the "Media Feature Pack", followed by Skype, Movies & TV, Groove Music, Windows Media Player, Xbox Game Bar, Windows Voice Recorder, and four codecs. However, DXVA and Media Foundation are still reserved in Windows 10 N/KN. The variation cannot be changed without a clean install, and keys for one variation will not work on other variations.

Home with Bing
As with Windows 8.1, a reduced-price "Windows 10 with Bing" SKU is available to OEMs; it is subsidized by having Microsoft's Bing search engine set as default, which cannot be changed to a different search engine by OEMs. It is intended primarily for low-cost devices, and is otherwise identical to Windows 10 Home.

Home Single Language
In some emerging markets, OEMs preinstall a variation of Windows 10 Home called Single Language without the ability to switch the display language. To change the display language, the user will need to upgrade to the standard editions of Windows 10 Home or Windows 10 Pro. It is otherwise identical to Windows 10 Home. However, it should not be confused with the standard OEM editions of Windows 10, where OEMs and mobile operators can restrict which display languages are preloaded and/or made available for download and installation for their target markets.

CMIT Government Edition
In May 2017, it was reported that Microsoft, as part of its partnership with China Electronics Technology Group, created a specially-modified variant of Windows 10 Enterprise ("G") designed for use within branches of the Chinese government. This variant is pre-configured to "remove features that are not needed by Chinese government employees", and allow the use of its internal encryption algorithms.

OEM variants (PC and Mobile)
As with Windows 10 Mobile and previous versions of Windows since Windows Phone 7 for smartphones and Windows 8 for PCs (since its mobile counterpart shares the same Windows NT kernel), device manufacturers (as well as mobile operators for devices with cellular capabilities) who preload Windows 10 can choose not to support certain display languages either during the OOBE process or available as optional downloads via Settings and/or the Microsoft Store based on the target market. For optional downloads, in the first scenario, the option to download the language pack (and any associated supplementary fonts) will not be available; in the second scenario, the installation will be blocked with the message "This app is not compatible with this device," where the "app" in question is a language pack from the Microsoft Store. Unlike Windows 10 Home Single Language, device manufacturers and mobile operators can support one, some, or even all of the display languages available (though many devices that do not run Single Language editions of Windows will likely support multiple display languages). OEM editions are otherwise identical to their retail counterparts without any other feature restrictions.

== Comparison chart ==
Guide
Item	Meaning
Yes	Feature is present in the given edition
Yes, since [update]	Feature is present in the given edition after installing a certain update
No	Feature is absent from the given edition
No, since [update]	Feature is absent from the given edition after installing a certain update (It might have been fully or partly present prior to that update)
[Explanation]	Feature is partly present in the given edition
[Explanation], since [update]	Feature is partly present in the given edition, after installing a certain update (It might have been fully present prior to that update, or not present at all)

Comparison of Windows 10 editions
Features	Home Single Language	Home	Pro	Pro (Education)	Education	Pro for Workstations	Enterprise
Architecture	IA-32, x86-64, ARM64 (for ARM64, since v1709)						
Availability	OEM licensing	OEM, Retail	OEM, Retail, Volume licensing	Academic; Volume Licensing	Volume licensing	OEM, Retail, Volume licensing	Volume licensing
Has N or KN variants?	No	Yes					
Maximum physical memory (RAM)	128 GB (Note: 32-bit architectures like IA-32 and ARM32 have a memory addressing limitation of four gigabytes. In practice, less than 4 GB of memory is addressable as the 4 GB space also includes the memory mapped peripherals.)		2 TB (2048 GB)			6 TB (6144 GB)	
Maximum CPU sockets	1		2			4	
Maximum CPU cores (Note: Windows 10 utilises processor groups on x86-64 to manage processor affinity and scheduling. The Windows 10 kernel has a hard-coded limit of 20 processor groups, and each processor group can contain up to 64 logical processors. A logical processor is either a physical or SMT core. Processor groups are allocated based on the NUMA topology of the system. One processor group cannot span multiple sockets or NUMA nodes. Processor groups are not available on IA-32; 32-bit builds instead use an older affinity mask implementation with a limit of 32 logical processors. The limit of 20 processor groups does not change between Windows 10 editions. There is no specific limit on the number of physical cores that can be used on Windows 10, unlike Windows Server where physical cores must be additionally licensed.)	32 logical cores on IA-32; 1280 logical cores (20 groups of 64 logical processors) on x86-64						
Minimum telemetry level (Note: There are three (previously four) telemetry levels, in the order of magnitude: Diagnostic data off (Security), Required (Basic), and Optional (Full). The higher the level, the more information that is sent to Microsoft. Previous Windows 10 versions had a level between Required and Optional, and the older names for the levels are shown in the parenthesis.)	Required data only				Diagnostic data off	Required data only	Diagnostic data off
Continuum	Yes						
Family Safety and Parental Controls	Yes						
Cortana (Note: Cortana is available only in certain markets. Experience may vary by region and device.)	Yes			Yes, disabled by default	Yes, since v1703	Yes	
Device encryption	Requires TPM (Note: The only device-encryption feature that is available in Windows 10 Home requires Trusted Platform Module version 2.0.)		Yes (Note: BitLocker is available and can be used in the absence of Trusted Platform Module.)				
Microsoft Edge	Yes						
Multiple language pack support	No	Depends on OEM, region, and carrier (Note: This feature was missing from Windows 10 version 1803, but not the prior or next versions.)		Yes		Depends on OEM, region, and carrier	Yes
Mobile device management	Yes						
Side-loading of line of business apps	Yes						
Virtual desktops	Yes						
Windows Hello (Note: Windows Hello requires specialized hardware, such as a fingerprint reader, illuminated IR sensor or other biometric sensor.)	Yes						
Can pause updates?	Yes, since v1903		Yes				
Windows Spotlight	Yes						
Microsoft Store suggestions	Yes			Yes, disabled by default		Yes	
Remote Desktop	Client only		Client and host				
Remote App	Client only				Client and host	Client only	Client and host
ReFS support	Non-creatable, since v1709					Yes	
Windows Subsystem for Linux	64-bit SKUs only		64-bit SKUs only since v1607				
Windows Sandbox	No		64-bit only, since v1903				
Hyper-V	No		64-bit SKUs only				
Assigned Access 8.1	No		Yes				
BitLocker	No		Yes				
Business Store	No		Yes				
Conditional Access	No		Yes				
Device Guard	No		Yes				
Encrypting File System	No		Yes				
Enterprise data protection	No		Yes				
Enterprise Mode Internet Explorer (EMIE)	No		Yes				
Joining a domain and Group Policy management	No		Yes				
Joining a Microsoft Azure Active Directory	No		Yes				
Private catalog	No		Yes				
Windows Analytics	No		Yes				
Windows Information Protection	No		Yes				
Windows Update for Business	No		Yes				
NVDIMM support	No					Yes	
SMB Direct (SMB over Remote Direct Memory Access [RDMA])	No		Client only, since v22H2 (Note: SMB Direct (SMB over Remote Direct Memory Access [RDMA]) is available in cleanly installed Windows 10 Pro 22H2 or later and absent if the operating system has been upgraded from versions prior to 22H2. SMB Direct server capability is absent from all editions of Windows 10, regardless of version.)		Client only		
AppLocker	No				Yes	No	Yes
BranchCache	No				Yes	No	Yes
Credential Guard (Pass the hash mitigations)	No				Yes	No	Yes
Microsoft App-V	No				Yes	No	Yes
Microsoft Desktop Optimization Pack (MDOP)	No				Yes	No	Yes
Microsoft UE-V	No				Yes	No	Yes
Start screen control with Group Policy	No				Yes	No	Yes
User experience control and lockdown	No				Yes	No	Yes
Unified Write Filter (UWF)	No				Yes	No	Yes
DirectAccess	No				Yes	No	Yes
Long-term servicing option available (LTSC)	No						Yes
Windows To Go (Note: On Windows 10 Pro, a Control Panel applet corresponding to this feature appears, but a Windows 10 Enterprise or Education image is still needed.)	No		No, since v2004				
Features	Home Single Language	Home	Pro	Pro (Education)	Education	Pro for Workstations	Enterprise

Microsoft OEM licensing formula takes display size, RAM capacity and storage capacity into account. In mid-2015, devices with 4 GB RAM were expected to be $20 more expensive than devices with 2 GB RAM.

== Upgrade path ==
=== Free upgrade ===
At the time of launch, Microsoft deemed Windows 7 (with Service Pack 1) and Windows 8.1 users eligible to upgrade to Windows 10 free of charge, so long as the upgrade took place within one year of Windows 10's initial release date. Windows RT and the respective Enterprise editions of Windows 7, 8, and 8.1 were excluded from this offer.

Windows 10 free upgrade matrix
Windows version and edition	Windows 10 edition
Windows 7 Starter SP1	Home
Windows 7 Home Basic SP1	Home
Windows 7 Home Premium SP1	Home
Windows 8.1 with Bing	Home
Windows 8.1	Home
Windows 7 Professional SP1	Pro
Windows 7 Ultimate SP1	Pro
Windows 8.1 Pro	Pro
Windows Phone 8.1	Mobile

=== Transition paths ===
The following table summarizes possible transition paths (upgrade, downgrade, or migration) that can be taken, provided that proper licenses are purchased.

Windows RT does not appear in this table because it cannot be upgraded to Windows 10.

On September 28, 2023, Microsoft disabled the free upgrade path to Windows 10 from Windows 7 or 8.x, although upgrades from Windows 10 to 11 are still supported.

Guide
Transition path	Meaning
Upgrade	Constitutes replacing the OS while preserving apps, their settings, and user data
Repair	Constitutes fixing a damaged OS by "upgrading" from one edition to the same
Downgrade	Similar to upgrade, but deliberately removes some features
Migration	Constitutes replacing the operating system, reinstalling the apps, restoring their settings via backup, and safeguarding user data against accidental deletion.
None	It is impossible to replace the OS with the intended target because of platform incompatibility

Supported transition targets
Windows version	Windows edition	Transition target						
Windows version	Windows edition	Windows 10 Home	Windows 10 Pro	Windows 10 Pro for Workstations	Windows 10 Pro (Education)	Windows 10 Education	Windows 10 Enterprise	Windows 10 Mobile
Windows XP or earlier	All versions	None	None	None	None	None	None	None
Windows XP x64 Edition, Windows Vista	All versions	Migration	Migration	Migration	Migration	Migration	Migration	None
Windows 7	Starter	Upgrade	Upgrade	Upgrade	Upgrade	Upgrade	Migration	None
Windows 7	Home Basic	Upgrade	Upgrade	Upgrade	Upgrade	Upgrade	Migration	None
Windows 7	Home Premium	Upgrade	Upgrade	Upgrade	Upgrade	Upgrade	Migration	None
Windows 7	Professional	Downgrade	Upgrade	Upgrade	Upgrade	Upgrade	Upgrade	None
Windows 7	Ultimate	Downgrade	Upgrade	Upgrade	Upgrade	Upgrade	Upgrade	None
Windows 7	Enterprise	Migration	Migration	Upgrade	Migration	Upgrade	Upgrade	None
Windows 8.1	(Core)	Upgrade	Upgrade	Upgrade	Upgrade	Upgrade	Migration	None
Windows 8.1	with Bing	Upgrade	Upgrade	Upgrade	Upgrade	Upgrade	Migration	None
Windows 8.1	Pro	Downgrade	Upgrade	Upgrade	Upgrade	Upgrade	Upgrade	None
Windows 8.1	Pro for Education	Downgrade	Upgrade	Upgrade	Upgrade	Upgrade	Upgrade	None
Windows 8.1	Pro with Media Center	Downgrade	Upgrade	Upgrade	Upgrade	Upgrade	Upgrade	None
Windows 8.1	Enterprise	Migration	Migration	Migration	Migration	Upgrade	Upgrade	None
Windows 8.1	Embedded Industry	Migration	Migration	Migration	Migration	Migration	Upgrade	None
Windows 8.1	Phone 8.1	None	None	None	None	None	None	Upgrade
Windows 10	Home	Repair	Upgrade	Upgrade	Upgrade	Upgrade	Upgrade	None
Windows 10	Pro	Downgrade	Repair	Upgrade	Upgrade	Upgrade	Upgrade	None
Windows 10	Pro for Workstations	Downgrade	Downgrade	Repair	Upgrade	Upgrade	Upgrade	None
Windows 10	Pro Education	Downgrade	Upgrade	Upgrade	Repair	Migration	Migration	None
Windows 10	Education	Migration	Migration	Migration	Migration	Repair	Upgrade	None
Windows 10	Enterprise	Migration	Migration	Migration	Migration	Downgrade	Repair	None
Windows 10	Mobile	None	None	None	None	None	None	None

== Release channels ==
Microsoft releases minor versions of Windows 10 through the free feature updates. Originally, Microsoft released feature updates semiannually. They contained new features as well as changes. With the release of Windows 11, however, Microsoft has changed the release schedule to annual. These feature updates do not contain any noticeable changes.

The pace at which a system receives feature updates depends on the "release channel" (originally, "release branch") from which the system downloads its updates.

=== Insider Channel ===
Windows Insider is a beta testing program that allows access to pre-release builds of Windows 10, enabling power users, developers, and vendors to test and provide feedback on future feature updates to Windows 10 as they are developed. Before the release of Windows 11, Windows Insider itself consisted of four "rings":

- The Dev channel (previously "Fast" ring) distributed new builds as they were released.
- The Beta channel (previously "Slow" ring) distributed new builds with a delay following their availability on the Fast ring.
- The "Release Preview" channel distributed release candidate builds.
- The now-closed "Skip Ahead" ring distributed builds of the next feature update while a current release was being finished.

After the release of Windows 11, only the "Release Preview" and "Beta" rings remains active.

=== General Availability Channel ===
Since 2022, the General Availability Channel (GAC) distributes feature updates annually. To receive these updates, users must either request them manually or wait for their version of Windows 10 to go out of support.

Originally, however, Microsoft distributed feature updates through two distinct channels:

- The "Current Branch" (CB) distributed all feature updates as they graduated from the Windows Insider program. Microsoft only supported the latest build. Windows would automatically install the latest feature update from CB. Users could defer the CB feature update for up to 365 days. Microsoft renamed CB to "Semi-Annual Channel (Targeted)" in version 1709.
- The "Current Branch for Business" (CBB), which was not available in the Home edition, distributed feature updates with a four-month delay. This allowed customers and vendors to evaluate and perform additional testing on new builds before broader deployments. Devices could be switched back to the Current Branch at any time. Microsoft renamed CBB to "Semi-Annual Channel" in version 1709.

Since version 1903, Microsoft dismantled the two-channel scheme in favor of a unified "Semi-Annual Channel" (SAC). Microsoft supports each SAC version of Windows for 30 months. Windows no longer installs new feature updates automatically before the expiry of the 30-months support period. With the release of Windows 11, Microsoft changed the release schedule to annual, and change the channel's name to "General Availability Channel" (GAC).

=== Long-Term Servicing Channel ===
LTSC exclusively distributes the "Enterprise LTSC", "IoT Core", and "IoT Enterprise LTSC" editions of Windows 10. Microsoft releases a new minor version of these editions every 2–3 years. LTSC builds adhere to Microsoft's traditional support policy which was in effect before Windows 10, including:

- Five years of mainstream support
- Critical and security updates for ten years after their release (excludes non-IoT editions version 2021 and newer)
- No feature updates from Windows Update

Microsoft discourages the use of LTSC editions outside of "special-purpose devices" that perform a fixed function and thus do not require new user experience features. As a result, these editions do not come with Microsoft Store, most Cortana features, and most bundled apps. LTSC was originally called the "Long-Term Servicing Branch" (LTSB) until 2016. Later, LTSC editions are included in Windows 11.

== See also ==
- Windows Server 2016, based on Windows 10 version 1607
- Windows Server 2019, based on Windows 10 version 1809
- Windows Server 2022, based on the Iron codebase found in some preview builds of Windows 10 from the second half of 2020.
- Xbox system software, an operating system now based on the Windows 10 core, designed to run on the Xbox consoles
- Windows 10 version history
