= Task View =

Task switcher and virtual desktop system

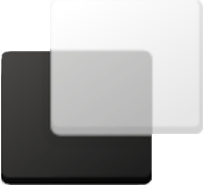

- Task view of Windows 11 and Windows 10
- Operating system: Windows 10, Windows 11
- Predecessor: Flip 3D
- Type: Virtual desktop, task switcher

Task View is a task switcher and virtual desktop system introduced in Windows 10 and is among the first features new to Windows 10. Task View allows a user to quickly locate an open window, quickly hide all windows and show the desktop, and to manage windows across multiple monitors or virtual desktops. Clicking the Task View button on the taskbar or swiping from the left side of the screen displays all open windows and allows users to switch between them, or switch between multiple workspaces. It was first previewed on September 30, 2014, at a Windows 10 press event in downtown San Francisco. A redesigned Task View with support for giving different wallpapers on each desktop has been introduced in Windows 11.

== Similar features ==
Similar effects are used on other operating systems and programs like X Window System, macOS's Mission Control, GNOME 3, and ChromeOS. However, Microsoft has provided a few similar features of its own:

Windows 3.0 first introduced a window switcher in 1990. Using Alt+Tab ↹, users could see a flattened view of all open windows. Every version of Windows since then has also provided this window switching functionality.

Windows Vista and Windows 7 provide an additional feature called Windows Flip 3D, which has a broadly similar purpose. Flip 3D allows a user to flip through all open windows with a 3D perspective. A downside to this method is that the front most window covers a significant portion of the other windows. On the other hand, this allows the user to see the contents of the front most window, while this can be difficult in similar applications that show the open windows in a grid, especially if the user has a large number of windows open. Vista's Desktop Window Manager exposes a public API that allows any application to access the same thumbnail representations that Flip3D uses, and so there are a number of third party add-ons that are able to provide this functionality in Vista. A very few third-party applications, such as the Emcee Desktop Organizer, provide organization of similar windows into visual "stacks," or support Windows 8's "Immersive" Apps.

Microsoft's Intellipoint Software for Microsoft Mice has a similar feature as it also works with live images of windows, rather than a static representations. Additionally, several freeware Windows applications exist to emulate the functionality.

== See also ==
- Zooming user interface
