= Microsoft Private Folder =

- Private Folder notification area icon
- Developer(s): Microsoft
- Stable release: 1.0 / July 2006
- Operating system: Windows XP
- Type: Encryption
- License: Proprietary

Private Folder password prompt

Microsoft Private Folder was a product (withdrawn and discontinued shortly after its first release) created by a Microsoft employee and available as part of their "Windows Genuine Advantage" program. It allowed users to protect private data in a password protected folder called 'My Private Folder' in the user's account.

The software runs only on Windows XP and is blocked due to "compatibility reasons" under Windows Vista and later.

== Usage ==
Microsoft Private Folder created a single folder on the user's desktop which, when opened for the first time, prompted the user to assign it a password. Every subsequent time the folder was opened, the user had to re-enter the same password to gain access. While the core implementation details of this service are not public, it is assumed that Private Folder used strong encryption with a key based solely on this password to secure the data contained in the folder. This is in contrast to Microsoft's Encrypting File System, where encryption is tied to a keypair which can be made accessible to IT staff.

Private Folder used a system service called prfldrsvc (display name: Private Folder Service), the function of which is not yet publicly known.
