= Feedback Hub =

Microsoft app on feedback for Windows

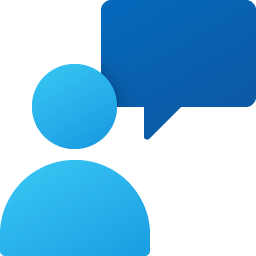

- Feedback Hub in Windows 11
- Developer: Microsoft
- Release: March 17, 2016; 10 years ago

Stable release(s) [±]
- Windows 11: August 2026 Update (2.2608.301) / September 8, 2026; 1 day ago
- Windows 10: 1.2608.17301 / August 28, 2026; 12 days ago
- Operating system: Windows 10, 11
- Predecessor: Windows Feedback, Insider Hub
- Website: support.microsoft.com/en-us/windows/send-feedback-to-microsoft-with-the-feedback-hub-app-f59187f8-8739-22d6-ba93-f66612949332

Feedback Hub is a universal app produced by Microsoft. It is designed to allow normal Windows users and Windows Insider users to provide feedback, feature suggestions, and bug reports for the operating system. It is available in the Microsoft Store and sometimes bundled with Windows 10 and Windows 11.

== History ==
=== Windows Feedback ===
In Windows 7 betas, there was a Feedback feature in the Control Panel, and many apps had links to "Send Feedback" next to their window controls. Windows 7 betas also collected telemetry. In Windows 8, telemetry was still collected but there was no organized method for users to provide and aggregate feedback. This limitation famously led to Microsoft developers removing the Start button and Windows Aero despite users' requests to leave those features in Windows.

Windows Feedback was one of the earliest new apps in Windows 10. It appeared on October 1, 2014 in the first Insider Preview, build 9841, as a method of providing suggestions for new features in Windows 10, which would not be released until July 29, 2015. Feedback could be sorted by topic and by relevance filters. Any user with a Microsoft Account could use the app. The filters included the number of Upvotes on feedback, feedback that was ranked the most "Trending", and the most recent feedback. It was not possible to directly access an HTML link to feedback from within the app. Windows Feedback did not use standard hamburger menus or back buttons in its design. Instead, the left sidebar featured levels of clickable panels and a custom back button was included in the upper left corner. Because Windows Feedback was created before standard Windows 10 controls had been made, it originally used the infrastructure of a Windows 8 app.

Windows Feedback collected telemetry and periodically asked users via a toast message to answer questions. Clicking on the toast or on the notification in the Action Center would open a questionnaire regarding a feature or app the user had been using. A common question format was a Likert scale rating for a feature and free-response text box to provide additional feedback. Questions sometimes were related to third-party apps the user was using, including Google Chrome and Mozilla Firefox.

Windows Feedback was deprecated with the Windows 10 Anniversary Update in 2016.

=== Insider Hub ===
The Insider Hub was designed specifically for users of the Windows Insiders program. It was preinstalled on preview builds of Windows 10 and could be manually installed on stable builds.

The Insider Hub used a hamburger menu found in other apps designed specifically for Windows 10. Articles sometimes failed to align properly and bled past the right side of the app window or the user's screen. Insider Hub was deprecated with the Anniversary Update.

Windows Feedback Hub comes pre-installed on Windows 11 as well.

=== Merger into Feedback Hub ===
The Feedback Hub was released to Windows Insiders on March 17, 2016. It was made generally available on May 20, 2016 and could be installed alongside Windows Feedback. It comes preinstalled on any computer with the Anniversary Update or later versions of Windows 10. It uses the same icon as Windows Feedback. Unlike Insider Hub, the Announcements and Quests articles are listed together on the home page of Feedback Hub, and they align based on available space.

== Features ==
Feedback Hub includes all features from its predecessors. The home view provides a search box for feedback, a count of feedback provided and upvotes received, a list of new features, options for rating the Windows build the user is currently using, and links to a user's profile and external information about Windows.

Users can provide feedback anonymously, or log in with a Microsoft Account or Azure Active Directory account. Signing in makes it possible to sync upvotes and achievements between devices, and view feedback you've previously given in the My Feedback section of the app.

Like any app, Feedback Hub itself is subject to feedback. Over time the feedback receipt screen has been updated, links to feedback and announcements have been made available, and cross-platform feedback can now be viewed and commented on. For instance, a user on a Windows 10 PC can see feedback and make comments for Windows 10 Mobile; however, a user cannot create new feedback or upvote feedback for a platform he or she is not currently using.

== Impact ==
Notable changes that have been made after users provided corresponding feedback include many new features in Mail, a Folder view in Photos, smaller sizes for Sticky Notes, and a new save icon in Sketchpad. Not every piece of feedback is accepted, and a higher number of upvotes does not automatically make a feature change more likely to happen. Feature requests explicitly declined by Microsoft engineers include bringing Windows Media Center to Windows 10 and eliminating automatic sign-in in Skype Preview and other apps. Nonetheless, upvotes indicate how many users agree with a piece of feedback.

== Controversy ==
=== Rigged system ===
On 24 December 2021, Neowin reported that the Feedback Hub is rigged. Neowin claimed that Microsoft silently deletes upvotes. Following reports from its readers, Neowin monitored the top 11 requested features for Windows 11 and observed that these items lost thousands of votes between 3 December to 24 December. The #1 feature has lost 9,634 votes. It is not possible to downvote requests in Feedback Hub, hence they claim this is not a user-triggered action.
