= Windows 10 =

2015 Microsoft operating system version

- Version of the Windows NT operating system

- Screenshot of Windows 10, showing the Start menu and Action Center in light theme
- Developer: Microsoft
- Written in: C, C++, C#, Assembly
- OS family: Microsoft Windows
- Working state: Current
- Source model: Closed-source; Source-available (through Shared Source Initiative)
- Released to manufacturing: July 15, 2015; 11 years ago
- General availability: July 29, 2015; 11 years ago
- Final release: 22H2 (10.0.19045.7846) (November 10, 2026; 7 days ago) [±]
- Final preview: Release Preview Channel (discontinued) 22H2 (10.0.19045.7846) (November 10, 2026; 7 days ago) [±]
- Marketing target: Personal computing
- Available in: 110 languages (Note: Specific language packs included on the device depend on the mobile operator (for cellular connected devices) or device manufacturer. Additional language packs are available for download on the Microsoft Store, pursuant to manufacturer and carrier support.)
- List of languages: Afrikaans - Afrikaans; Azərbaycan - Azerbaijani; Bosanski - Bosnian; Català (Espanya, valencià) - Catalan (Spain, Valencian); Català (Espanya) - Catalan (Spain); Čeština - Czech; Cymraeg - Welsh; Dansk - Danish; Deutsch - German; Èdè Yorùbá - Yoruba; Eesti - Estonian; English (United Kingdom) - English (United Kingdom); English (United States) - English (United States); Español (España) - Spanish (Spain); Español (México) - Spanish (Mexico); Euskara - Basque; Filipino - Filipino; Français (Canada) - French (Canada); Français (France) - French (France); Gaeilge - Irish; Gàidhlig - Scottish Gaelic; Galego - Galician; Hausa - Hausa; Hrvatski - Croatian; Igbo - Igbo; Indonesia - Indonesian; IsiXhosa - Xhosa; IsiZulu - Zulu; Íslenska - Icelandic; Italiano - Italian; Kʼicheʼ - Kʼicheʼ; Kinyarwanda - Kinyarwanda; Kiswahili - Swahili; Latviešu - Latvian; Lëtzebuergesch - Luxembourgish; Lietuvių - Lithuanian; Magyar - Hungarian; Malti - Maltese; Māori - Maori; Melayu - Malay; Nederlands - Dutch; Norsk bokmål - Norwegian Bokmål; Norsk nynorsk - Norwegian Nynorsk; Oʻzbek - Uzbek; Polski - Polish; Português (Brasil) - Portuguese (Brazil); Português (Portugal) - Portuguese (Portugal); Română - Romanian; Runasimi - Quechua; Sesotho sa Leboa - Northern Soto; Setswana - Tswana; Shqip - Albanian; Slovenčina - Slovak; Slovenščina - Slovenian; Srpski - Serbian (Latin); Suomi - Finnish; Svenska - Swedish; Tiếng Việt - Vietnamese; Türkçe - Turkish; Türkmen dili - Turkmen; Wolof - Wolof; Ελληνικά - Greek; Беларуская - Belarusian; Български - Bulgarian; Кыргызча - Kyrgyz; Қазақ тілі - Kazakh; Македонски - Macedonian; Монгол - Mongolian; Русский - Russian; Српски (ћирилица, Босна и Херцеговина) - Serbian (Cyrillic, Bosnia & Herzegovina); Српски (ћирилица, Србија) - Serbian (Cyrillic, Serbia); Татар - Tatar; Тоҷикӣ - Tajik; Українська - Ukrainian; ქართული - Georgian; Հայերեն - Armenian; עברית - Hebrew; ئۇيغۇرچە - Uyghur; اردو - Urdu; العربية - Arabic; پنجابی - Punjabi (Arabic); سنڌي - Sindhi (Arabic); فارسی (افغانستان) - Persian (Afghanistan); فارسی (ایران) - Persian (Iran); کوردیی ناوەندی - Sorani Kurdish; ትግርኛ - Tigrinya; አማርኛ - Amharic; कोंकणी - Konkani; नेपाली - Nepali; मराठी - Marathi; हिन्दी - Hindi; অসমীয়া - Assamese; বাংলা (বাংলাদেশ) - Bangla (Bangladesh); বাংলা (ভারত) - Bangla (India); ਪੰਜਾਬੀ - Punjabi; ગુજરાતી - Gujarati; ଓଡ଼ିଆ - Odia; தமிழ் - Tamil; తెలుగు - Telugu; ಕನ್ನಡ - Kannada; മലയാളം - Malayalam; සිංහල - Sinhala; ไทย - Thai; ລາວ - Lao; ខ្មែរ - Khmer; ᏣᎳᎩ - Cherokee; 한국어 - Korean; 中文 (简体) - Chinese (Simplified); 中文 (繁體) - Chinese (Traditional); 日本語 - Japanese
- Update method: Windows Update; Windows Server Update Services
- Supported platforms: IA-32, x86-64, ARM64
- Kernel type: Hybrid (Windows NT kernel)
- Userland: Native API; Windows API.NET Framework; Universal Windows Platform; Windows Subsystem for Linux; NTVDM (IA-32 only)
- Default user interface: Windows shell (graphical)
- License: Trialware, Microsoft Software Assurance, MSDN subscription, Microsoft Imagine
- Preceded by: Windows 8.1 (2013)
- Succeeded by: Windows 11 (2021)
- Official website: Windows 10 (archived at Wayback Machine)

Support status
- Unsupported as of October 14, 2025 (Note: Applies to all non-LTSC versions with the latest feature update & excludes IoT Core edition.) Paid and Free Extended Security Updates (ESU): (Note: For version 22H2); Supported until October 12, 2027, for consumers Supported until at most October 10, 2028, for businesses and schools See § Extended Security Updates for details. Exceptions exist (Note: For LTSC versions & some editions, along with some hardware configurations.) until at most January 13, 2032, See § Support lifecycle for details.

Windows 10 is a major release of the Windows NT operating system developed by Microsoft. The successor to Windows 8.1, it was released to manufacturing on July 15, 2015, became generally available on July 29, 2015, and was a free upgrade to users of Windows 7, 8, and 8.1. Its server counterparts are Windows Server 2016, 2019, and 2022. It was succeeded by Windows 11 in October 2021.

In contrast to the tablet-oriented approach of its predecessor, Windows 10 returned to a desktop-oriented interface in line with previous versions of Windows and reintroduced the Start menu. Other features included the Cortana virtual assistant, Task View and virtual desktops, Action Center, biometric authentication through Windows Hello, an improved Settings component, Xbox Live integration, and DirectX 12. Also, Microsoft Edge was introduced, deprecating Internet Explorer. Unlike previous NT releases, Windows 10 received free feature updates on an ongoing basis. (Note: In addition to additional test builds of Windows 10, which are available to Windows Insiders.) Alternatively, enterprise environments can use long-term support milestones that receive only critical and security updates. An ARM version of Windows 10 was released in 2018.

Windows 10 received generally positive reviews. Praise was given to the return of the desktop interface, improved bundled software compared to Windows 8.1, and other capabilities, while criticism was directed at behavioral changes such as mandatory update installation, privacy concerns over data collection, and adware-like tactics to promote the operating system on release. Microsoft aimed to have Windows 10 installed on over a billion devices within three years of release; ultimately, that goal was reached in March 2020, almost five years later. By January 2018, it surpassed Windows 7 as the most popular version of Windows worldwide, until Windows 11 took the top spot in June 2025. As of October 2026, Windows 10 is the second-most-used version of Windows, accounting for 25% worldwide share, while Windows 11 holds 74%.

It is the last version of Windows that supports 32-bit processors, (Note: And the last major version to support 64-bit processors that do not meet the x86-x64-v2 (i.e., having POPCNT and SSE4.2) or ARMv8.1 specifications, across all minor versions. (Note: If going by unofficial requirements, Windows 11 version 23H2 is the final minor version to support processors without POPCNT and SSE4.2, or without ARMv8.1 minimum specifications.)) BIOS firmware, (Note: Excluding IoT editions) and systems with no TPM or TPM 1.2; (Note: Excluding IoT editions and select Microsoft approved OEM systems.) it is also the last to officially lack a CPU model check before installation. (Note: Although not on all editions, e.g., some Windows 11 IoT editions are excluded from the check.) Support ended on October 14, 2025, except for editions in the Long-Term Servicing Channel (LTSC) or enrolled in the Extended Security Updates program.

== Development ==
At the Microsoft Worldwide Partner Conference in 2011, Andrew Lees, the chief of Microsoft's mobile technologies, said that the company intended to have a single software ecosystem for PCs, smartphones, tablets, and other devices: "We won't have an ecosystem for PCs, and one for phones, and one for tablets‍—‌they'll all come together."

In December 2013, technology writer Mary Jo Foley reported that Microsoft was working on an update to Windows 8 codenamed "Threshold", after a planet in its Halo franchise. Similarly to "Blue" (which became Windows 8.1), Foley described Threshold, not as a single operating system, but as a "wave of operating systems" across multiple Microsoft platforms and services, quoting Microsoft sources, scheduled for the second quarter of 2015. She also stated that one of the goals for Threshold was to create a unified application platform and development toolkit for Windows, Windows Phone and Xbox One (which all use a similar kernel based on Windows NT).

At the Build Conference in April 2014, Microsoft's Terry Myerson unveiled an early build of what would become Windows 10 (build 9697) that added the ability to run Microsoft Store apps inside desktop windows and a more traditional Start menu modeled after Windows 7's design by using only a portion of the screen and including an application listing in the left column, with the right column displaying Windows 8-style app tiles. Myerson said that these changes would occur in a future update, but did not elaborate. Microsoft also unveiled the concept of a "universal Windows app", allowing Windows Store apps created for Windows 8.1 to be ported to Windows Phone 8.1 and Xbox One while sharing a common codebase, with an interface designed for different device form factors, and allowing user data and licenses for an app to be shared between multiple platforms. Windows Phone 8.1 would share nearly 90% of the common Windows Runtime APIs with Windows 8.1 on PCs.

A screenshot of a build identifying itself as "Windows Technical Preview" (numbered 9834) was leaked in September 2014, showing a new virtual desktop system, a notification center, and a new File Explorer icon.

=== Announcement ===
On September 30, 2014, Microsoft officially announced that Threshold would be unveiled during a media event as Windows 10. Myerson said that Windows 10 would be Microsoft's "most comprehensive platform ever", providing a single, unified platform for desktop and laptop computers, tablets, smartphones, and all-in-one devices. He emphasized that Windows 10 would take steps towards restoring user interface mechanics from Windows 7 to improve the experience for users on non-touch devices, noting criticism of Windows 8's touch-oriented interface by keyboard and mouse users. Despite these concessions, Myerson noted that the touch-optimized interface would evolve as well on Windows 10.

In regards to Microsoft naming the new operating system Windows 10 instead of Windows 9, Terry Myerson said that "based on the product that's coming, and just how different our approach will be overall, it wouldn't be right to call it Windows 9." He also joked that they could not call it "Windows One" (referring to several recent Microsoft products with a similar brand, such as OneDrive, OneNote, and the Xbox One) because Windows 1.0 already existed. At a San Francisco conference in October 2014, Tony Prophet, Microsoft's Vice President of Windows Marketing, said that Windows 9 "came and went", and that Windows 10 would not be "an incremental step from Windows 8.1", but "a material step. We're trying to create one platform, one eco-system that unites as many of the devices from the small embedded Internet of Things, through tablets, through phones, through PCs and, ultimately, into the Xbox." Dave Plummer speculated that Microsoft wanted to avoid compatibility issues with applications that check the operating system's version string for "Windows 9" and believe that they are running on Windows 95 or Windows 98.

Further details surrounding Windows 10's consumer-oriented features were presented during another media event held on January 21, 2015, titled "Windows 10: The Next Chapter". The keynote featured the unveiling of Cortana integration within the operating system, new Xbox-oriented features, Windows 10 Mobile, an updated Office Mobile suite, Surface Hub‍—‌a large-screened Windows 10 device for enterprise collaboration based upon Perceptive Pixel technology, along with HoloLens‑augmented reality eyewear and an associated platform for building apps that can render holograms through HoloLens.

Additional developer-oriented details surrounding the "Universal Windows Platform" concept were revealed and discussed during Microsoft's Build developers' conference. Among them were the unveiling of "Islandwood", which provides a middleware toolchain for compiling Objective-C-based software (particularly iOS) to run as universal apps on Windows 10 and Windows 10 Mobile. A port of Candy Crush Saga made using the toolkit, which shared much of its code with the iOS version, was demonstrated, alongside the announcement that the King-developed game would be bundled with Windows 10 at launch.

At the 2015 Ignite conference, Microsoft employee Jerry Nixon stated that Windows 10 would be the "last version of Windows", a statement reflecting the company's intent to apply the software as a service business model to Windows, with new versions and updates to be released over an indefinite period. In 2021, however, Microsoft announced that Windows 10 would be succeeded on compatible hardware by Windows 11—and that Windows 10 support will end on October 14, 2025, marking a departure from what had been dubbed "Windows as a service". PC World argued that the widely reported comment was however taken out of context, noting that the official event transcript marks it only as a segue rather than a core part of the talk. It argues that Nixon was referring to the fact that he could talk freely at the event because 10 was the last version in current development.

=== Marketing ===
On July 20, 2015, Microsoft began "Upgrade Your World", an advertising campaign centering on Windows 10, with the premiere of television commercials in Australia, Canada, France, Germany, Japan, the United Kingdom, and the United States. The commercials focused on the tagline "A more human way to do", emphasizing new features and technologies supported by Windows 10 that sought to provide a more "personal" experience to users. The campaign culminated with launch events in thirteen cities on July 29, 2015, which celebrated "the unprecedented role our biggest fans played in the development of Windows 10".

=== Release ===
On July 29, 2015, Microsoft officially announced that Windows 10 would be released for retail purchase as a free upgrade from earlier versions of Windows. In comparison to previous Windows releases, which had a longer turnover between the release to manufacturing (RTM) and general release to allow for testing by vendors (and in some cases, the development of "upgrade kits" to prepare systems for installation of the new version), an HP executive explained that because it knew Microsoft targeted the operating system for a 2015 release, the company was able to optimize its then-current and upcoming products for Windows 10 in advance of its release, negating the need for such a milestone.

The general availability build of Windows 10, numbered 10240, was first released to Windows Insider channels for pre-launch testing on July 15, 2015, prior to its formal release. Although a Microsoft official said there would be no specific RTM build of Windows 10, 10240 was described as an RTM build by media outlets because it was released to all Windows Insider members at once (rather than to users on the "Fast ring" first), it no longer carried pre-release branding and desktop watermark text, and its build number had mathematical connections to the number 10 in reference to the operating system's naming. The Enterprise edition was released to volume licensing on August 1, 2015.

Windows 10 is distributed digitally through the "Media Creation Tool", which is functionally identical to the Windows 8 online installer, and can also be used to generate an ISO image or USB install media. In-place upgrades are supported from most editions of Windows 7 with Service Pack 1 and Windows 8.1 with Update 1, while users with Windows 8 must first upgrade to Windows 8.1. Changing between architectures (e.g., upgrading from 32-bit edition to a 64-bit edition) via in-place upgrades is not supported; a clean installation is required. In-place upgrades may be rolled back to the device's previous version of Windows, provided that 30 days have not passed since installation, and backup files were not removed using Disk Cleanup.

Windows 10 was available in 190 countries and 111 languages upon its launch, and as part of efforts to "re-engage" with users in China, Microsoft also announced that it would partner with Qihoo and Tencent to help promote and distribute Windows 10 in China, and that Chinese PC maker Lenovo would provide assistance at its service centers and retail outlets for helping users upgrade to Windows 10. At retail, Windows 10 is priced similarly to editions of Windows 8.1, with U.S. prices set at $119 and $199 for Windows 10 Home and Pro respectively. A Windows 10 Pro Pack license allows upgrades from Windows 10 Home to Windows 10 Pro. Retail copies only ship on USB flash drive media; however, system builder copies still ship as DVD-ROM media. New devices shipping with Windows 10 were also released during the operating system's launch window.

Windows RT devices cannot be upgraded to Windows 10.

=== Free upgrade offer ===
During its first year of availability, upgrade licenses for Windows 10 could be obtained at no charge for devices with a genuine license for an eligible edition of Windows 7 or 8.1.

This offer did not apply to Enterprise editions, as customers under an active Software Assurance (SA) contract with upgrade rights are entitled to obtain Windows 10 Enterprise under their existing terms. All users running non-genuine copies of Windows, and those without an existing Windows 7 or 8/8.1 license, were ineligible for this promotion; although upgrades from a non-genuine version were possible, they result in a non-genuine copy of 10.

On the general availability build of Windows 10 (the original release), to activate and generate the "digital entitlement" for Windows 10, the operating system must have first been installed as an in-place upgrade. During the free upgrade, a genuineticket.xml file is created in the background and the system's motherboard details are registered with a Microsoft Product Activation server. Once installed, the operating system can be reinstalled on that particular system via normal means without a product key, and the system's license will automatically be detected via online activation – in essence, the Microsoft Product Activation Server will remember the system's motherboard and give it the green light for product re-activation. Because of installation issues with Upgrade Only installs, the November Update (version 1511) included additional activation mechanisms. This build treated Windows 7 and Windows 8/8.1 product keys as Windows 10 product keys, meaning they could be entered during installation to activate the free license, without the need to upgrade first to "activate" the hardware with Microsoft's activation servers. For major Original Equipment Manufacturers (OEMs), Windows 8/8.1 and Windows 10 OEM product keys are embedded in the firmware of the motherboard and if the correct edition of Windows 10 is present on the installation media, they are automatically inputted during installation. Since the release of the Fall Creators Update (version 1709), Microsoft decided to release multi-edition installation media, to alleviate installation and product activation issues users experienced because of accidentally installing the wrong edition of Windows 10.

The Windows Insider Preview version of Windows 10 automatically updated itself to the generally released version as part of the version progression and continues to be updated to new beta builds, as it had throughout the testing process. Microsoft explicitly stated that Windows Insider was not a valid upgrade path for those running a version of Windows that is ineligible for the upgrade offer; although, if it was not installed with a license carried over from an in-place upgrade to 10 Insider Preview from Windows 7 or 8.1, the Insider Preview does remain activated as long as the user does not exit the Windows Insider program.

The offer was promoted and delivered via the "Get Windows 10" application (also known as GWX), which was automatically installed via Windows Update ahead of Windows 10's release, and activated on systems deemed eligible for the upgrade offer. Via a notification area icon, users could access an application that advertised Windows 10 and the free upgrade offer, check device compatibility, and "reserve" an automatic download of the operating system upon its release. On July 28, a pre-download process began in which Windows 10 installation files were downloaded to some computers that had reserved it. Microsoft said that those who reserved Windows 10 would be able to install it through GWX in a phased rollout process. The operating system could alternatively be downloaded at any time using a separate "Media Creation Tool" setup program, that allows for the creation of DVD or USB installation media.

In May 2016, Microsoft announced that the free upgrade offer would be extended to users of assistive technologies; however, Microsoft did not implement any means of certifying eligibility for this offer, which some outlets thereby promoted as being a loophole to fraudulently obtain a free Windows 10 upgrade. Microsoft said that the offer is not intended to be used in this manner. In November 2017, Microsoft announced that this program would end on December 31, 2017.

However, another method was found that allowed Windows 7 and 8/8.1 users to upgrade to Windows 10 using existing licenses, even though the free upgrade offers officially ended in 2017. Some outlets have continued to promote it as a free method of upgrading from the now-unsupported Windows 7. This free upgrade method was officially closed by Microsoft on September 20, 2023. However, as of 2024, there are some reports that it still works, under certain conditions.

== Licensing ==
During upgrades, Windows 10 licenses are not tied directly to a product key. Instead, the license status of the system's current installation of Windows is migrated, and a "Digital license" (known as "Digital entitlement" in version 1511 or earlier) is generated during the activation process, which is bound to the hardware information collected during the process. If Windows 10 is reinstalled cleanly and there have not been any significant hardware changes since installation (such as a motherboard change), the online activation process will automatically recognize the system's digital entitlement if no product key is entered during installations. However, unique product keys are still distributed within retail copies of Windows 10. As with previous non-volume-licensed variants of Windows, significant hardware changes will invalidate the digital entitlement, and require Windows to be re-activated.

== Features ==
Windows 10 makes its user experience and functionality more consistent between different classes of device, and addresses many shortcomings of the user interface introduced in Windows 8. Windows 10 Mobile, the successor to Windows Phone 8.1, shared some user interface elements and apps with its PC counterpart.

Windows 10 supports universal apps, an expansion of the Metro-style first introduced in Windows 8. Universal apps can be designed to run across multiple Microsoft product families with nearly identical code‍—‌including PCs, tablets, smartphones, embedded systems, Xbox One, Surface Hub and Mixed Reality. The Windows user interface was revised to handle transitions between a mouse-oriented interface and a touchscreen-optimized interface based on available input devices‍—‌particularly on 2-in-1 PCs. Both interfaces include an updated Start menu which incorporates elements of Windows 7's traditional Start menu with the tiles of Windows 8. Windows 10 also introduced the Microsoft Edge series of web browsers, a virtual desktop system, a window and desktop management feature called Task View, support for fingerprint and face recognition login, new security features for enterprise environments, and DirectX 12.

The Windows Runtime app ecosystem was revised into the Universal Windows Platform (UWP). These universal apps are made to run across multiple platforms and device classes, including smartphones, tablets, Xbox One consoles, and other devices compatible with Windows 10. Windows apps share code across platforms, have responsive designs that adapt to the needs of the device and available inputs, can synchronize data between Windows 10 devices (including notifications, credentials, and allowing cross-platform multiplayer for games), and are distributed through the Microsoft Store (rebranded from Windows Store since September 2017). Developers can allow "cross-buys", where purchased licenses for an app apply to all of the user's compatible devices, rather than only the one they purchased on (e.g., a user purchasing an app on PC is also entitled to use the smartphone version at no extra cost).

The ARM version of Windows 10 allows running applications for x86 processors through 32-bit software emulation.

On Windows 10, the Microsoft Store serves as a unified storefront for apps, video content, and eBooks. Windows 10 also allows web apps and desktop software (using either Win32 or .NET Framework) to be packaged for distribution on the Microsoft Store. Desktop software distributed through Windows Store is packaged using the App-V system to allow sandboxing.

=== User interface and desktop ===
The "Task View" display is a new feature to Windows 10, allowing the use of multiple workspaces.

A new iteration of the Start menu is used on the Windows 10 desktop, with a list of places and other options on the left side, and tiles representing applications on the right. The menu can be resized, and expanded into a full-screen display, which is the default option in Tablet mode. A new virtual desktop system was added by a feature known as Task View, which displays all open windows and allows users to switch between them, or switch between multiple workspaces. Universal apps, which previously could be used only in full screen mode, can now be used in self-contained windows similarly to other programs. Program windows can now be snapped to quadrants of the screen by dragging them to the corner. When a window is snapped to one side of the screen, Task View appears and the user is prompted to choose a second window to fill the unused side of the screen (called "Snap Assist"). The Windows system icons were also changed.

Charms have been removed; their functionality in universal apps is accessed from an App commands menu on their title bar. In its place is Action Center, which displays notifications and settings toggles. It is accessed by clicking an icon in the notification area, or dragging from the right of the screen. Notifications can be synced between multiple devices. The Settings app (formerly PC Settings) was refreshed and now includes more options that were previously exclusive to the desktop Control Panel.

Windows 10 is designed to adapt its user interface based on the type of device being used and available input methods. It offers two separate user interface modes: a user interface optimized for mouse and keyboard, and a "Tablet mode" designed for touchscreens. Users can toggle between these two modes at any time, and Windows can prompt or automatically switch when certain events occur, such as disabling Tablet mode on a tablet if a keyboard or mouse is plugged in, or when a 2-in-1 PC is switched to its laptop state. In Tablet mode, programs default to a maximized view, and the taskbar contains a back button and hides buttons for opened or pinned programs by default; Task View is used instead to switch between programs. The full screen Start menu is used in this mode, similarly to Windows 8, but scrolls vertically instead of horizontally.

=== System security ===
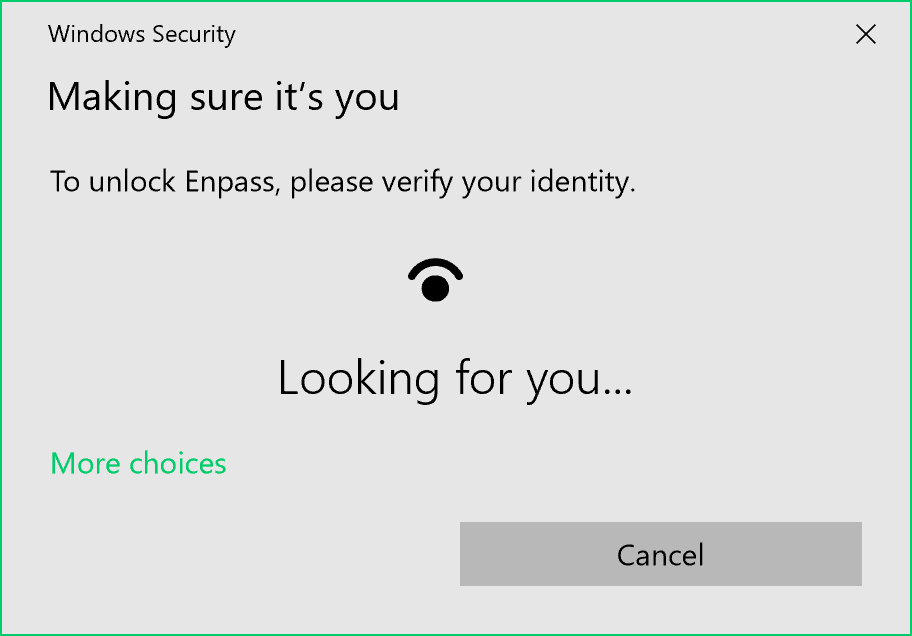
Windows Hello unlock prompt while using Enpass (a password manager)

Windows 10 incorporates multi-factor authentication technology based upon standards developed by the FIDO Alliance. The operating system includes improved support for biometric authentication through the Windows Hello platform. Devices with supported cameras (requiring infrared illumination, such as Intel RealSense) allow users to log in with iris or face recognition, similarly to Kinect. Devices with supported readers allow users to log in through fingerprint recognition. Support was also added for palm-vein scanning through a partnership with Fujitsu in February 2018. Credentials are stored locally and protected using asymmetric encryption.

In 2017, researchers demonstrated that Windows Hello could be bypassed on fully-updated Windows 10 version 1703 with a color printout of a person's picture taken with an IR camera. In 2021, researchers were again able to bypass the Windows Hello functionalities by using custom hardware disguised as a camera, which presented an IR photo of the owner's face.

In addition to biometric authentication, Windows Hello supports authentication with a PIN. By default, Windows requires a PIN to consist of four digits, but can be configured to permit more complex PINs. However, a PIN is not a simpler password. While passwords are transmitted to domain controllers, PINs are not. They are tied to one device, and if compromised, only one device is affected. Backed by a Trusted Platform Module (TPM) chip, Windows uses PINs to create strong asymmetric key pairs. As such, the authentication token transmitted to the server is harder to crack. In addition, whereas weak passwords may be broken via rainbow tables, TPM causes the much-simpler Windows PINs to be resilient to brute-force attacks.

When Windows 10 was first introduced, multi-factor authentication was provided by two components: Windows Hello and Passport (not to be confused with the Passport platform of 1998). Later, Passport was merged into Windows Hello.

The enterprise edition of Windows 10 offers additional security features; administrators can set up policies for the automatic encryption of sensitive data, selectively block applications from accessing encrypted data, and enable Device Guard‍—‌a system which allows administrators to enforce a high-security environment by blocking the execution of software that is not digitally signed by a trusted vendor or Microsoft. Device Guard is designed to protect against zero-day exploits, and runs inside a hypervisor so that its operation remains separated from the operating system itself.

=== Command line ===
The console windows based on Windows Console (for any console app, not just PowerShell and Windows Command Prompt) can now be resized without any restrictions, can be made to cover the full screen by pressing Alt+↵ Enter, and can use standard keyboard shortcuts, such as those for cut, copy, and paste. Other features such as word wrap and transparency were also added. These functions can be disabled to revert to the legacy console if needed.

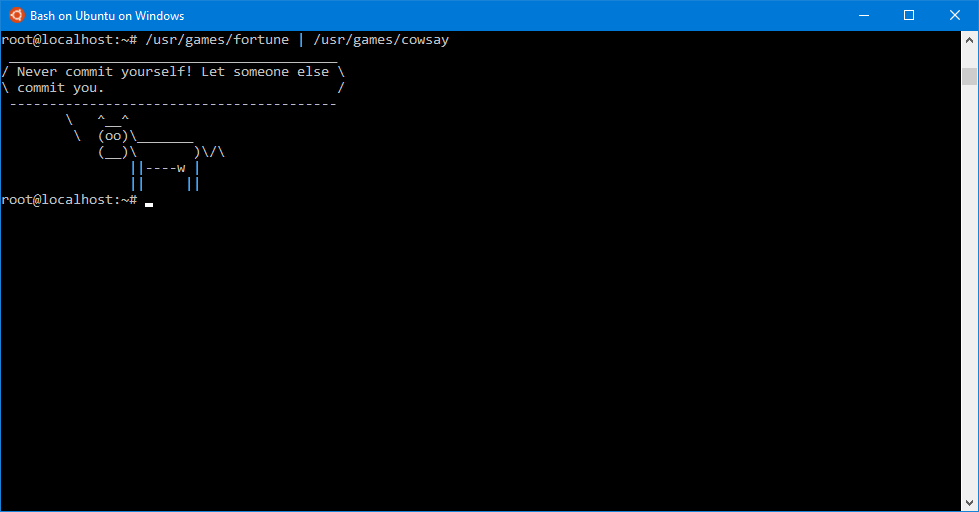
Bash for Ubuntu, running on Windows 10

The Anniversary Update added Windows Subsystem for Linux (WSL), which allows installing a user space environment from a supported Linux distribution that runs natively on Windows. The subsystem translates Linux system calls to those of the Windows NT kernel (only claims full system call compatibility as of WSL 2, included in a later Windows update). The environment can execute the Bash shell and 64-bit command-line programs (WSL 2 also supports 32-bit Linux programs and graphics, assuming supporting software installed, and GPUs support for other uses). Linux distributions for Windows Subsystem for Linux are obtained through Microsoft Store. The feature initially supported an Ubuntu-based environment; Microsoft announced in May 2017 that it would add Fedora and OpenSUSE environment options as well.

=== Storage requirements ===
To reduce the storage footprint of the operating system, Windows 10 automatically compresses system files. The system can reduce the storage footprint of Windows by approximately 1.5 GB for 32-bit systems and 2.6 GB for 64-bit systems. The level of compression used is dependent on a performance assessment performed during installations or by OEMs, which tests how much compression can be used without harming operating system performance. Furthermore, the Refresh and Reset functions use runtime system files instead, making a separate recovery partition redundant, allowing patches and updates to remain installed following the operation, and further reducing the amount of space required for Windows 10 by up to 12 GB. These functions replace the WIMBoot mode introduced on Windows 8.1 Update, which allowed OEMs to configure low-capacity devices with flash-based storage to use Windows system files out of the compressed WIM image typically used for installation and recovery. Windows 10 also includes a function in its Settings app that allows users to view a breakdown of how their device's storage capacity is being used by different types of files, and determine whether certain types of files are saved to internal storage or an SD card by default.

=== Online services and functionality ===
Windows 10 introduces Microsoft Edge [Legacy], a new default web browser. It featured a new standards-compliant rendering engine derived from Trident, and also includes annotation tools and integration with other Microsoft platforms present within Windows 10. Internet Explorer 11 is maintained on Windows 10 for compatibility purposes, but is deprecated in favor of Edge and, since mid-June 2022, is no longer supported on editions which follow Microsoft's Modern Lifecycle Policy. The initial version of Edge (Edge Legacy) was later succeeded by a new iteration derived from the Chromium Project and Blink layout engine (initially referred to as "New Edge"), which replaced the previous EdgeHTML-based version of Edge (Edge Legacy), and is bundled with the OS by default from build 20H2 onwards.

Windows 10 incorporates a universal search box located alongside the Start and Task View buttons, which can be hidden or condensed into a single button. Previous versions featured Microsoft's intelligent personal assistant Cortana, which was first introduced with Windows Phone 8.1 in 2014, and supports both text and voice input. Many of its features are a direct carryover from Windows Phone, including integration with Bing, setting reminders, a Notebook feature for managing personal information, as well as searching for files, playing music, launching applications and setting reminders or sending emails. Since the November 2019 update, Microsoft has begun to downplay Cortana as part of a repositioning of the product towards enterprise use, with the May 2020 update removing its Windows shell integration and consumer-oriented features.

Microsoft Family Safety is replaced by Microsoft Family, a parental controls system that applies across Windows platforms and Microsoft online services. Users can create a designated family, and monitor and restrict the actions of users designated as children, such as access to websites, enforcing age ratings on Microsoft Store purchases, and other restrictions. The service can also send weekly e-mail reports to parents detailing a child's computer usage. Unlike previous versions of Windows, child accounts in a family must be associated with a Microsoft account‍—‌which allows these settings to apply across all Windows 10 devices that a particular child is using.

Windows 10 also offers the Wi-Fi Sense feature originating from Windows Phone 8.1; users can optionally have their device automatically connect to suggested open hotspots, and share their home network's password with contacts (either via Skype, People, or Facebook) so they may automatically connect to the network on a Windows 10 device without needing to manually enter its password. Credentials are stored in an encrypted form on Microsoft servers and sent to the devices of the selected contacts. Passwords are not viewable by the guest user, and the guest user is not allowed to access other computers or devices on the network. Wi-Fi Sense is not usable on 802.1X-encrypted networks. Adding "_optout" at the end of the SSID will also block the corresponding network from being used for this feature.

Universal calling and messaging apps for Windows 10 are built in as of the November 2015 update: Messaging, Skype Video, and Phone. These offer built-in alternatives to the Skype download and sync with Windows 10 Mobile.

=== Multimedia and gaming ===
Windows 10 provides greater integration with the Xbox ecosystem. Xbox SmartGlass is succeeded by the Xbox Console Companion (formerly the Xbox app), which allows users to browse their game library (including both PC and Xbox console games), and Game DVR is also available using a keyboard shortcut, allowing users to save the last 30 seconds of gameplay as a video that can be shared to Xbox Live, OneDrive, or elsewhere. Windows 10 also allows users to control and play games from an Xbox One console over a local network. The Xbox Live SDK allows application developers to incorporate Xbox Live functionality into their apps, and future wireless Xbox One accessories, such as controllers, are supported on Windows with an adapter. Microsoft also intends to allow cross-purchases and save synchronization between Xbox One and Windows 10 versions of games; Microsoft Studios games such as ReCore and Quantum Break are intended as being exclusive to Windows 10 and Xbox One.

Candy Crush Saga and Microsoft Solitaire Collection are also automatically installed upon installation of Windows 10.

Windows 10 adds native game recording and screenshot capture ability using the newly introduced Game Bar. Users can also have the OS continuously record gameplay in the background, which then allows the user to save the last few moments of gameplay to the storage device.

Windows 10 adds FLAC and HEVC codecs and support for the Matroska media container, allowing these formats to be opened in Windows Media Player and other applications. Windows Media Center is no longer bundled.

Windows 10 includes DirectX 12, alongside WDDM 2.0. Unveiled March 2014 at GDC, DirectX 12 aims to provide "console-level efficiency" with "closer to the metal" access to hardware resources, and reduced CPU and graphics driver overhead. Most of the performance improvements are achieved through low-level programming, which allow developers to use resources more efficiently and reduce single-threaded CPU bottlenecking caused by abstraction through higher level APIs. DirectX 12 will also feature support for vendor agnostic multi-GPU setups. WDDM 2.0 introduces a new virtual memory management and allocation system to reduce workload on the kernel-mode driver.

=== Font support ===
Windows 10 adds three new default typefaces compared to Windows 8, but omits several others. The removed typefaces are available in supplemental packs and may be added manually over a non-metered internet connection.

== Editions and pricing ==
Windows 10 is available in five main editions for personal computing devices; the Home and Pro editions of which are sold at retail in most countries, and as pre-loaded software on new computers. Home is aimed at home users, while Pro is aimed at power users and small businesses. Each edition of Windows 10 includes all of the capabilities and features of the edition below it, and adds additional features oriented towards its market segments; for example, Pro adds additional networking and security features such as BitLocker, Device Guard, Windows Update for Business, and the ability to join a domain. Enterprise and Education, contain additional features aimed towards business environments, and are only available through volume licensing.

As part of Microsoft's unification strategies, Windows products that are based on Windows 10's common platform but meant for specialized platforms are marketed as editions of the operating system, rather than as separate product lines. An updated version of Microsoft's Windows Phone operating system for smartphones, and also tablets, was branded as Windows 10 Mobile. Editions of Enterprise and Mobile will also be produced for embedded systems, along with Windows 10 IoT Core, which is designed specifically for use in small footprint, low-cost devices and Internet of Things (IoT) scenarios and is similar in scope to Windows Embedded Compact.

On May 2, 2017, Microsoft unveiled Windows 10 S (referred to in leaks as Windows 10 Cloud), a feature-limited edition of Windows 10 which was designed primarily for devices in the education market (competing, in particular, with ChromeOS netbooks), such as the Surface Laptop that Microsoft also unveiled at this time. The OS restricts software installation to applications obtained from Microsoft Store; the device may be upgraded to Windows 10 Pro for a fee to enable unrestricted software installation. As a time-limited promotion, Microsoft stated that this upgrade would be free on the Surface Laptop until March 31, 2018. Windows 10 S also contains a faster initial setup and login process, and allows devices to be provisioned using a USB drive with the Windows Intune for Education platform. In March 2018, Microsoft announced that Windows 10 S would be deprecated because of market confusion and would be replaced by "S Mode", an OEM option wherein Windows defaults to only allowing applications to be installed from Microsoft Store, but does not require payment in order to disable these restrictions.

== Support lifecycle ==
Support status summary
Expiration date
- Servicing/normal support: October 14, 2025
- Paid Extended Security Updates (ESU) support: For consumers: October 12, 2027; For businesses and schools: October 10, 2028

Applicable Windows 10 editions Excluding LTSB/LTSC editions:
- Home, Pro, Pro for Workstations, Education, Pro Education, Enterprise, IoT Enterprise, Team.

Exceptions
- Windows 10 Mobile, Mobile Enterprise, and IoT Mobile: Unsupported as of January 14, 2020
- Windows 10 IoT Core (non-LTSC): Unsupported as of November 10, 2020
- Windows 10 Enterprise and IoT Enterprise 2015 LTSB: Mainstream support ended on October 13, 2020; Extended support ended on October 14, 2025
- Windows 10 Enterprise and IoT Enterprise 2016 LTSB: Mainstream support ended on October 12, 2021; Extended support ended on October 13, 2026
- Windows 10 Enterprise, IoT Enterprise, and IoT Core 2019 LTSC: Mainstream support ended on January 9, 2024; Extended support until January 9, 2029
- Windows 10 Enterprise 2021 LTSC: Supported until January 12, 2027
- Windows 10 IoT Enterprise 2021 LTSC: Mainstream support until January 12, 2027; Extended support until January 13, 2032

Windows 10 was originally released following Microsoft's fixed lifecycle policy, receiving mainstream support for five years after its original release, followed by five years of extended support. However, starting in February 2018, this was switched to the modern lifecycle policy (excluding LTSC), with each version receiving 18 or 30 (only for H2 versions) months of support after release, depending on edition. Furthermore, Home edition does not support the deferral of feature updates and will thus often receive a new version of Windows 10 prior to the end of the 18-month support period.

Microsoft stopped supporting standard Windows 10 releases on October 14, 2025. On April 27, 2023, Microsoft announced that version 22H2 would be the last of Windows 10, meaning that that version would extend beyond the normal 18/30 months of support.

=== Hardware exceptions ===
Microsoft's support lifecycle policy for the operating system notes that updates "are cumulative, with each update built upon all of the updates that preceded it", that "a device needs to install the latest update to remain supported", and that a device's ability to receive future updates will depend on hardware compatibility, driver availability, and whether the device is within the OEM's "support period"‍‍—‌a new aspect not accounted for in lifecycle policies for previous versions. This policy was first invoked in 2017 to block Intel Clover Trail devices from receiving the Creators Update, as Microsoft asserts that future updates "require additional hardware support to provide the best possible experience", and that Intel no longer provided support or drivers for the platform. Microsoft stated that these devices would no longer receive feature updates, but would still receive security updates through January 2023.

=== Extended Security Updates ===
Microsoft announced an Extended Security Update (ESU) service in December 2023 for Windows 10 devices, lasting until October 2028, on an annual pricing plan. Unlike previous Windows ESU services, Windows 10 ESU will be available to individual consumers as well, originally only for a single year (until October 13, 2026), but was later silently updated to two years (October 12, 2027).

Regarding pricing, Windows 365 and Azure Virtual Desktop customers with Windows 10 virtual machines will get ESU for free; for everyone else, however, annual pricing doubles each year. For businesses, per device, the pricing will be $61 for the first year, $122 for the second, and $244 for the third. Businesses using a cloud based update management solution such as Microsoft Intune will get a 25% discount. For education users, per device pricing is $1 for the first year, then $2 and $4 for each subsequent year. Consumer pricing is $30 per device, for one year only, with enrollment starting in 2025. In July 2025, Microsoft launched free Extended Security Updates (ESU) for Windows 10 consumers who sync their PC settings to the cloud using a Microsoft account, or by redeeming 1,000 Microsoft Rewards points. The free updates are available for two years, extending security support until October 12, 2027.

=== Support and update branches ===
The following table collects current status of the aforementioned updating and support of different branches of Windows 10:

Update branch	Microsoft internal channels (more information here)	Windows Insider Preview Channels (WIPB)	General Availability Channel "End user"	Long-Term Servicing Channel "Mission critical"
Edition	Home, Pro, Pro for Workstations, Education, Pro Education, Enterprise, IoT Enterprise & Team			Enterprise LTSC, IoT Enterprise LTSC, & IoT Core LTSC
Critical updates Security patches and stability updates	Continuous	Continuous as made available	Automatic	User can defer updates indefinitely
Feature upgrades Non-critical functionality and feature updates	Continuous	Continuous as made available	Automatic or defer	Only through LTSC in-place upgrades
Feature upgrades cadence	Continuous	Continuous as released	Continuous, deferrable (excluding Home edition) for 12 months at a time; once a deferral period is past, no further deferrals possible until latest updates are installed	LTSC releases are stable 'snapshots' of AC
Upgrade support	Continuous updating, features come and go silently with new builds		Continuous updating or in-place upgrade to supported LTSC builds	In-place upgrade support for the three most recent LTSC builds
Update support	Only the latest build is supported		10 years (or ~6 months from deferring build upgrade or until future builds require hardware support the old device does not have.) + 1 year paid extended security updates (ESU) for consumers or 3 years for businesses and schools	5 years (for 2021, non-IoT) or 5 years mainstream + 5 years extended (for 2019 and older, all IoT versions)
Update methods	Windows Update		Windows Update; Windows Update for Business; Windows Server Update Services	

== Updates and support ==
Unlike previous versions of Windows, Windows Update does not allow the selective installation of updates, and all updates (including patches, feature updates, and driver software) are downloaded and installed automatically. Users can only choose whether their system will reboot automatically to install updates when the system is inactive, or be notified to schedule a reboot. If a wireless network is designated as "Metered"—a function which automatically reduces the operating system's background network activity to conserve limits on Internet usage—most updates are not downloaded until the device is connected to a non-metered network. Version 1703 allows wired (Ethernet) networks to be designated as metered, but Windows may still download certain updates while connected to a metered network.

In version 2004, by installing the August 2020 security update and later versions, driver and non-security updates pushed via Windows Update that are considered optional are no longer automatically downloaded and installed in their devices. Users can access them on Settings > Update & Security > Windows Update > View optional update.

Updates can cause compatibility or other problems; a Microsoft troubleshooter program allows bad updates to be uninstalled.

Under the Windows end-user license agreement, users consent to the automatic installation of all updates, features and drivers provided by the service, and implicitly consent "without any additional notice" to the possibility of features being modified or removed. The agreement also states, specifically for users of Windows 10 in Canada, that they may pause updates by disconnecting their device from the Internet.

Windows Update can also use a peer-to-peer system for distributing updates; by default, users' bandwidth is used to distribute previously downloaded updates to other users, in combination with Microsoft servers. Users can instead choose to only use peer-to-peer updates within their local area network.

=== Preview releases ===
A public beta program for Windows 10 known as the Windows Insider Program began with the first publicly available preview release on October 1, 2014. Insider preview builds are aimed towards enthusiasts and enterprise users for the testing and evaluation of updates and new features. Users of the Windows Insider program receive occasional updates to newer preview builds of the operating system and continue to be able to evaluate preview releases after general availability (GA) in July 2015‍—‌this is in contrast to previous Windows beta programs, where public preview builds were released less frequently and only during the months preceding GA. Windows Insider builds continue to be released, post release to manufacturing (RTM) of Windows 10.

=== Versions ===
Overview of Windows 10 versions
Name	Version	Codename	Build	Release date	End of support by edition					
Name	Version	Codename	Build	Release date	GAC			LTSC		
Name	Version	Codename	Build	Release date	Home, Pro, Pro Education, Pro for Workstations	Education, Enterprise, IoT Enterprise	ESU	Mainstream	Extended	ESU
Windows 10	1507	Threshold	10240	July 29, 2015	May 9, 2017		—N/a	October 13, 2020	October 14, 2025	—N/a
Windows 10 November Update	1511	Threshold 2	10586	November 10, 2015	October 10, 2017	April 10, 2018	—N/a	—N/a		
Windows 10 Anniversary Update	1607	Redstone	14393	August 2, 2016	April 10, 2018 (Note: January 10, 2023, for Intel Clover Trail based systems.)	April 9, 2019	—N/a	October 12, 2021	October 13, 2026	October 2029
Windows 10 Creators Update	1703	Redstone 2	15063	April 5, 2017	October 9, 2018	October 8, 2019	—N/a	—N/a		
Windows 10 Fall Creators Update	1709	Redstone 3	16299	October 17, 2017	April 9, 2019	October 13, 2020	—N/a	—N/a		
Windows 10 April 2018 Update	1803	Redstone 4	17134	April 30, 2018	November 12, 2019	May 11, 2021	—N/a	—N/a		
Windows 10 October 2018 Update	1809	Redstone 5	17763	November 13, 2018	November 10, 2020	May 11, 2021	—N/a	January 9, 2024	January 9, 2029	?
Windows 10 May 2019 Update	1903	19H1	18362	May 21, 2019	December 8, 2020		—N/a	—N/a		
Windows 10 November 2019 Update	1909	19H2	18363	November 12, 2019	May 11, 2021	May 10, 2022	—N/a	—N/a		
Windows 10 May 2020 Update	2004	20H1	19041	May 27, 2020	December 14, 2021		—N/a	—N/a		
Windows 10 October 2020 Update	20H2	20H2	19042	October 20, 2020	May 10, 2022	May 9, 2023	—N/a	—N/a		
Windows 10 May 2021 Update	21H1	21H1	19043	May 18, 2021	December 13, 2022		—N/a	—N/a		
Windows 10 November 2021 Update	21H2	21H2	19044	November 16, 2021	June 13, 2023	June 11, 2024	—N/a	January 12, 2027	January 13, 2032 (Note: Only for IoT Enterprise)	?
Windows 10 2022 Update	22H2	22H2	19045	October 18, 2022	October 14, 2025		October 10, 2028 (Note: Only for Education, Enterprise, and Pro editions)	—N/a		
Legend: Unsupported Supported

=== Feature updates ===
Windows 10 is often described by Microsoft as being a "service", as it receives regular "feature updates" that contain new features and other updates and fixes. In April 2017, Microsoft stated that these updates would be released twice a year every March and September in the future, which eventually continued until version 21H2. Mainstream builds of Windows 10, up to 2004, were labeled "YYMM", with "YY" representing the two-digit year and "MM" representing the month of release. For example, version 1809 was released in September (the ninth month) of 2018. This was changed with the 20H2 release where "MM" represents the half of the year in which the update was released, for example H1 for the first half and H2 for the second half.

Before version 1903, the pace at which feature updates are received by devices was dependent on which release channel was used. The default branch for all users of Windows 10 Home and Pro was "Semi-Annual Channel (Targeted)" (formerly "Current Branch", or "CB"), which received stable builds after they were publicly released by Microsoft. Each build of Windows 10 is supported for either 18 or 30 (only for H2 versions) months after its original release, dependent on edition. In enterprise environments, Microsoft officially intended that this branch was used for "targeted" deployments of newly released stable versions so that they could be evaluated and tested on a limited number of devices before a wider deployment. Once a stable build is certified by Microsoft and its partners as being suitable for broad deployment, the build is then released on the "Semi-Annual Channel" (formerly "Current Branch for Business", or "CBB"), which is supported by the Pro and Enterprise editions of Windows 10. Semi-Annual Channel receives stable builds on a four-month delay from their release on the Targeted channel. Administrators can also use the "Windows Update for Business" system, as well as existing tools such as WSUS and System Center Configuration Manager, to organize structured deployments of feature updates across their networks.

The Windows Insider branches receive unstable builds as they are released; it is divided into two channels, "Dev" (which receives new builds immediately after their release), and "Beta" (whose releases are slightly delayed from their "Dev" release).

Enterprise licensees may use the Windows 10 Enterprise LTSC (formerly LTSB) edition, where "LTSC" stands for "Long-Term Servicing Channel", which only receive quality of life updates (i.e. security patches), and has a full 5 or 10-year support lifecycle for each build. This edition is designed for "special-purpose devices" that perform a fixed function (such as automated teller machines and medical equipment). For this reason, it excludes Cortana, Microsoft Store, and all bundled Universal Windows Platform apps (including but not limited to Microsoft Edge, hence these builds ship only with Internet Explorer as browser). Microsoft director Stella Chernyak explained that "we have businesses [that] may have mission-critical environments where we respect the fact they want to test and stabilize the environment for a long time." Four LTSC builds have been released, correlating with the RTM, 1607, 1809, and 21H2 versions of Windows 10, respectively.

In July 2017, Microsoft announced changes in the terminology for Windows branches as part of its effort to unify the update cadence with that of Office 365 ProPlus and Windows Server 2016. The branch system now defines two paces of upgrade deployment in enterprise environments, "targeted" initial deployment of a new version on selected systems immediately after its stable release for final testing, and "broad" deployment afterwards. Hence, "Current Branch" is now known as "Semi-Annual Channel (Targeted)", and "Current Branch for Business" for broad deployment is now referred to as "Semi-Annual Channel".

In February 2019, Microsoft announced changes again in delivering updates beginning with release of version 1903: a single SAC will be released, SAC-T will be retired, and users are no longer able to switch to different channels. Instead, these updates can be deferred from 30 to 90 days, or depending on how the device was configured to defer the updates. In April 2019, it was announced that, in addition, feature updates will no longer be automatically pushed to users. However, after the release of version 2004, the update only pushed for those running a feature update version that is nearing end of service or it can be paused for up to 35 days. In November 2021, following the launch of version 21H2, Microsoft made a commitment to deliver feature updates every October or November. Thus, Microsoft rebranded the "Semi-Annual Channel" to the "General Availability Channel". On April 27, 2023, Microsoft announced that version 22H2, released in November 2022, would be the last feature update for Windows 10.

Feature updates prior to version 1909 were distributed solely as an in-place upgrade installation, requiring the download of a complete operating system package (approximately 3.5 GB in size for 64-bit systems). Unlike previous builds, version 1909 was designed primarily as an update rollup version of 1903, which focused primarily on minor feature additions and enhancements. For upgrades to 1909 from 1903, a new delivery method was used where its changes were delivered as part of the monthly cumulative update, but were left in a dormant state until the 1909 update "enablement" patch is installed. The full upgrade process was still used for those using builds prior to 1903.

=== Features in development ===
In May 2017, Microsoft unveiled Fluent Design System (previously codenamed "Project Neon"), a revamp of Microsoft Design Language 2 that includes guidelines for the designs and interactions used within software designed for all Windows 10 devices and platforms. The new design language will include the more prominent use of motion, depth, and translucency effects. Microsoft stated that the implementation of this design language would be performed over time, and it had already started to implement elements of it in the Creators Update and Fall Creators Update.

On December 7, 2016, Microsoft announced that, as part of a partnership with Qualcomm, it planned to introduce support for running Win32 software on ARM architecture with a 32-bit x86 processor emulator, in 2017. Terry Myerson stated that this move would enable the production of Qualcomm Snapdragon-based Windows devices with cellular connectivity and improved power efficiency over Intel-compatible devices, and still capable of running the majority of existing Windows software (unlike the previous Windows RT, which was restricted to Windows Store apps). Microsoft is initially targeting this project towards laptops. Microsoft launched the branding Always Connected PCs in December 2017 to market Windows 10 devices with cellular connectivity, which included two ARM-based 2-in-1 laptops from Asus and HP featuring the Snapdragon 835 system-on-chip, and the announcement of a partnership between AMD and Qualcomm to integrate its Snapdragon X16 gigabit LTE modem with AMD's Ryzen Mobile platform.

In August 2019, Microsoft began testing changes to its handling of the user interface on convertible devices—downplaying the existing "Tablet Mode" option in favor of presenting the normal desktop with optimizations for touch when a keyboard is not present, such as increasing the space between taskbar buttons and displaying the virtual keyboard when text fields are selected.

In April 2021, the ability to run Linux applications using a graphical user interface, such as Audacity, directly in Windows, was introduced as a preview. This feature would later be included as part of the updated Windows Subsystem for Linux 2 for Windows 11 only.

In November 2022, Microsoft released Windows Subsystem For Linux 2 on the Microsoft Store, for both Windows 10 and 11, allowing Linux graphical user interface applications to be used natively using WSL.

== System requirements ==
Hardware requirements for Windows 10
Component	Minimum	Recommended
Processor	1 GHz clock rate IA-32 or x86-64 architecture with support for PAE, NX and SSE2 and at least 2 cores x86-64 CPUs must also support CMPXCHG16B, PrefetchW, and LAHF/SAHF instructions.	
Memory (RAM)	IA-32 edition: 1 GB x86-64 edition: 2 GB	4 GB
Graphics card	DirectX 9 graphics device WDDM 1.0 or higher driver	WDDM 1.3 or higher driver
Display	800×600 pixels	—N/a
Input device	Keyboard and mouse	Multi-touch display
Internal storage space	32 GB	—N/a
Optical disc drive for its installer	Any optical disc drive capable of reading DVD-ROM (Note: For Windows 10 since Version 1809 (x86-64 only), DVD-ROM DL (Double-layer DVD-ROM) instead of DVD-ROM SL (Single-layer DVD-ROM).) media.	
External storage for its installer	Any external storage with at least 4 GB. (Note: For Windows 10 since Version 1809 (x86-64 only), 8 GB instead of 4 GB.)	

Additional requirements for optional functionality
Feature	Requirements
Biometric authentication	Fingerprint reader
BitLocker	Trusted Platform Module (TPM) 1.2 or 2.0, a dedicated USB flash drive, or a password
Device encryption	Trusted Platform Module (TPM) 2.0 and InstantGo
Hyper-V	Second Level Address Translation (SLAT)
Miracast	Wi-Fi adapter that supports Wi-Fi Direct, NDIS 6.30, WDDM 1.3 (Ivy Bridge)
Secure attention	Hardware equivalent of Ctrl+Alt+Delete or ⊞ Win+Power key sequence
Secure Boot	UEFI v2.3.1 Errata B with Microsoft Windows certification authority in its database
Speech recognition	Microphone
Windows Hello	Illuminated infrared camera

The basic hardware requirements to install Windows 10 were initially the same as those for Windows 8 and Windows 8.1, and only slightly higher than for Windows 7 and Windows Vista. At the May 2019 update, the minimum disk space requirement was increased from 16 GB (32-bit version) or 20 GB (64-bit version) to 32 GB. On new installations Windows permanently reserves around 7 GB of disk space to use for temporary files during updates.

The 64-bit variants require a CPU that supports certain instructions. Devices with low storage capacity must provide a USB flash drive or SD card with sufficient storage for temporary files during upgrades.

Some pre-built devices may be described as "certified" by Microsoft. Certified tablets must include Power, Volume up, and Volume down keys; ⊞ Win and Rotation lock keys are no longer required.

As with Windows 8, all certified devices must ship with UEFI Secure Boot enabled by default. Unlike Windows 8, OEMs are no longer required to make Secure Boot settings user-configurable, meaning that devices may optionally be locked to run only Microsoft-signed operating systems. A supported infrared-illuminated camera is required for Windows Hello face authentication, and a supported fingerprint reader is required for Windows Hello fingerprint authentication. Device Guard requires a UEFI system with no third-party certificates loaded, and CPU virtualization extensions (including SLAT and IOMMU) enabled in firmware.

Beginning with Intel Kaby Lake and AMD Bristol Ridge, Windows 10 is the only version of Windows that Microsoft will officially support on newer CPU microarchitectures. Terry Myerson stated that Microsoft did not want to make further investments in optimizing older versions of Windows and associated software for newer generations of processors. These policies were criticized by the media, who especially noted that Microsoft was refusing to support newer hardware (particularly Intel's Skylake CPUs, which was also originally targeted by the new policy with a premature end of support that was ultimately retracted) on Windows 8.1, a version of Windows that was still in mainstream support until January 2018. In addition, an enthusiast-created modification was released that disabled the check and allowed Windows 8.1 and earlier versions to continue to work on the platform.

Windows 10 versions 1703 and later do not support Intel Clover Trail system-on-chips, per Microsoft's stated policy of only providing updates for devices during their OEM support period.

Starting with Windows 10 version 2004, Microsoft will require new OEM devices to use 64-bit processors, and will therefore cease the distribution of x86 (32-bit) variants of Windows 10 via OEM channels. The 32-bit variants of Windows 10 will remain available via non-OEM channels, and Microsoft will continue to "[provide] feature and security updates on these devices". This was later followed by Windows 11 dropping support for 32-bit hardware altogether, thus making Windows 10 the final version of Windows to have a 32-bit version available.

=== Physical memory limits ===
The maximum amount of RAM that Windows 10 can support varies depending on the product edition and the processor architecture, as follows.

Physical memory limits of Windows 10
Edition	Processor architecture	
Edition	IA-32 (32-bit)	x64 (64-bit)
Enterprise	4 GB	6 TB
Pro for Workstations	—N/a	6 TB
Education	4 GB	2 TB
Pro Education	4 GB	2 TB
Pro	4 GB	2 TB
Home	4 GB	128 GB

=== Processor limits ===
Maximum number of physical processors that Windows 10 supports is: 1 for Home; 2 for Pro, Pro Education, and Education; and 4 for Pro for Workstations and Enterprise.

Maximum number of logical processors (Note: A logical processor is either: One of the cores on one of the physical processors without SMT; or one of the two threads handled by one of the cores on one of the physical processors with SMT.) that Windows 10 supports is: 32 for 32-bit (x86-32) and 1,280 for 64-bit (x86-64).

== Reception ==
Windows 10 received generally positive reviews, with most reviewers considering it superior to its predecessor Windows 8. CNN Business praised every aspect of Windows 10. TechRadar felt that it could be "the new Windows 7", citing the operating system's more familiar user interface, improvements to bundled apps, performance improvements, a "rock solid" search system, and the Settings app being more full-featured than its equivalents on 8 and 8.1. The Edge browser was praised for its performance, although it was not in a feature-complete state at launch. While considering them a "great idea in principle", concerns were shown for Microsoft's focus on the universal app ecosystem:

It's by no means certain that developers are going to flock to Windows 10 from iOS and Android simply because they can convert their apps easily. It may well become a no-brainer for them, but at the moment a conscious decision is still required.

Engadget was similarly positive, noting that the upgrade process was painless and that Windows 10's user interface had balanced aspects of Windows 8 with those of previous versions with a more mature aesthetic. Cortana's always-on voice detection was considered to be its "true strength", also citing its query capabilities and personalization features, but noting that it was not as pre-emptive as Google Now. Windows 10's stock applications were praised for being improved over their Windows 8 counterparts, and for supporting windowed modes. The Xbox app was also praised for its Xbox One streaming functionality, although recommending its use over a wired network because of inconsistent quality over Wi-Fi. In conclusion, it was argued that "Windows 10 delivers the most refined desktop experience ever from Microsoft, and yet it's so much more than that. It's also a decent tablet OS, and it's ready for a world filled with hybrid devices. And, barring another baffling screwup, it looks like a significant step forward for mobile. Heck, it makes the Xbox One a more useful machine."

On the other hand Ars Technica panned the new Tablet mode interface for removing the charms and app switching, making the Start button harder to use by requiring users to reach for the button on the bottom-left rather than at the center of the screen when swiping with a thumb, and for making application switching less instantaneous through the use of Task View. Microsoft Edge was praised for being "tremendously promising", and "a much better browser than Internet Explorer ever was", but criticized it for its lack of functionality on-launch. In conclusion, contrasting Windows 8 as being a "reliable" platform albeit consisting of unfinished concepts, Windows 10 was considered "the best Windows yet", and was praised for having a better overall concept in its ability to be "comfortable and effective" across a wide array of form factors, but that it was buggier than previous versions of Windows were on-launch.

ExtremeTech felt that Windows 10 restricted the choices of users, citing its more opaque setting menus, forcing users to give up bandwidth for the peer-to-peer distribution of updates, and for taking away user control of specific functions, such as updates, explaining that "it feels, once again, as if Microsoft has taken the seed of a good idea, like providing users with security updates automatically, and shoved the throttle to maximum." Windows 10 has also received criticism because of deleting files without user permission after auto updates.

Critics characterized the release of Windows 10 as being forced onto users of past versions of Windows. Critics have also noted that Windows 10 heavily emphasizes freemium services, and contains various advertising facilities. Some outlets have considered these to be a hidden "cost" of the free upgrade offer. Examples of these have included microtransactions in bundled games such as Microsoft Solitaire Collection, default settings that display promotions of "suggested" apps in the Start menu, "tips" on the lock screen that may contain advertising, ads displayed in File Explorer for Office 365 subscriptions on Creators' Update, and various advertising notifications displayed by default which promote Microsoft Edge when it is not set as the default web browser (including, in a September 2018 build, nag pop-ups displayed to interrupt the installation process of competitors).

Due to the high system requirements of its successor Windows 11, some critics have cited Windows 10 being better than its successor and have warned not to switch to Windows 11 given its high system requirements, despite very limited new features compared to Windows 10 at the time of release.

=== Market share and sales ===
Windows PC market share (of Windows) statistics
Windows 11	62.16%
Windows 10	36.03%
Windows 7	1.05%
Windows XP	0.42%
Windows 8	0.16%
Windows 8.1	0.14%
Other	0.04%
Worldwide market share of desktop Windows versions (as of January 31, 2026) according to Statcounter. Note: the values shown are percentages of Windows marketshare only; StatCounter tracks Windows vs. other operating systems separately.

Up to August 2016, Windows 10 usage was increasing, with it then plateauing, while eventually in 2018, it became more popular than Windows 7 (though Windows 7 was still more used in some countries in Asia and Africa in 2019). As of March 2020, the operating system is running on over a billion devices, reaching the goal set by Microsoft two years after the initial deadline.

Twenty-four hours after it was released, Microsoft announced that over 14 million devices were running Windows 10. On August 26, Microsoft said over 75 million devices were running Windows 10, in 192 countries, and on over 90,000 unique PC or tablet models. According to Terry Myerson, there were over 110 million devices running Windows 10 as of October 6, 2015. On January 4, 2016, Microsoft reported that Windows 10 had been activated on over 200 million devices since the operating system's launch in July 2015.

According to StatCounter, Windows 10 overtook Windows 8.1 in December 2015. Iceland was the first country where Windows 10 was ranked first (not only on the desktop, but across all platforms), with several larger European countries following. For one week in late November 2016, Windows 10 overtook first rank from Windows 7 in the United States, before losing it again. By February 2017, Windows 10 was losing market share to Windows 7.

In mid-January 2018, Windows 10 had a slightly higher global market share than Windows 7, with it noticeably more popular on weekends, while popularity varies widely by region, e.g. Windows 10 was then still behind in Africa and far ahead in some other regions e.g. Oceania. Windows 10 is now the most used version in virtually all countries. Its market share peaked at 82.5% in December 2021, shortly after the introductions of its successor, and since then the share has been declining ever since Windows 11's release, which is now the second most popular Windows version in many countries.

=== Update system changes ===
Windows 10 Home is permanently set to download all updates automatically, including cumulative updates, security patches, and drivers, and users cannot individually select updates to install or not. Tom Warren of The Verge felt that, given web browsers such as Google Chrome had already adopted such an automatic update system, such a requirement would help to keep all Windows 10 devices secure, and felt that "if you're used to family members calling you for technical support because they've failed to upgrade to the latest Windows service pack or some malware disabled Windows Update then those days will hopefully be over."

Concerns were raised that because of these changes, users would be unable to skip the automatic installation of updates that are faulty or cause issues with certain system configurations—although build upgrades will also be subject to public beta testing via Windows Insider program. There were also concerns that the forced installation of driver updates through Windows Update, where they were previously designated as "optional", could cause conflicts with drivers that were installed independently of Windows Update.

Criticism was also directed towards Microsoft's decision to no longer provide specific details on the contents of cumulative updates for Windows 10. On February 9, 2016, Microsoft retracted this decision and began to provide release notes for cumulative updates on the Windows website.

Some users reported that during the installation of the November upgrade, some applications (particularly utility programs such as CPU-Z and Speccy) were automatically uninstalled during the upgrade process, and some default programs were reset to Microsoft-specified defaults (such as Photos app, and Microsoft Edge for PDF viewing), both without warning.

Further issues were discovered upon the launch of the Anniversary Update ("Redstone"), including a bug that caused some devices to freeze (but addressed by cumulative update KB3176938, released on August 31, 2016), and that fundamental changes to how Windows handles webcams had caused many to stop working.

In June 2017, a Redstone 3 Insider build (RS_EDGE_CASE in PC and rs_IoT on Mobile) was accidentally released to both Insider and non-Insider users on all Windows 10 devices, but the update was retracted, with Microsoft apologizing and releasing a note on their Windows Insider Program blog describing how to prevent the build from being installed on their device. According to Dona Sarkar, this was due to "an inadvertent deployment to the engineering system that controls which builds/which rings to push out to insiders."

A Gartner analyst felt that Windows 10 Pro was becoming increasingly inappropriate for use in enterprise environments because of support policy changes by Microsoft, including consumer-oriented upgrade lifecycle length, and only offering extended support for individual builds to Enterprise and Education editions of Windows 10.

Critics have acknowledged that Microsoft's update and testing practices had been affecting the overall quality of Windows 10. In particular, it was pointed out that Microsoft's internal testing departments had been prominently affected by a major round of layoffs undertaken by the company in 2014. Microsoft relies primarily on user testing and bug reports via the Windows Insider program (which may not always be of sufficient quality to identify a bug), as well as correspondence with OEMs and other stakeholders. In the wake of the known folder redirection data loss bug in the version 1809, it was pointed out that bug reports describing the issue had been present on the Feedback Hub app for several months prior to the public release. Following the incident, Microsoft updated Feedback Hub so that users may specify the severity of a particular bug report. When announcing the resumption of 1809's rollout, Microsoft stated that it planned to be more transparent in its handling of update quality in the future, through a series of blog posts that will detail its testing process and the planned development of a "dashboard" that will indicate the rollout progress of future updates.

=== Distribution practices ===
Microsoft was criticized for the tactics that it used to promote its free upgrade campaign for Windows 10, including adware-like behaviors, using dark patterns to coax users into installing the operating system, downloading installation files without user consent, and making it difficult for users to suppress the advertising and notifications if they did not wish to upgrade to Windows 10. The upgrade offer was marketed and initiated using the "Get Windows 10" (GWX) application, which was first downloaded and installed via Windows Update in March 2015. Third-party programs were created to assist users in applying measures to disable GWX.

In September 2015, it was reported that Microsoft was triggering automatic downloads of Windows 10 installation files on all compatible Windows 7 or 8.1 systems configured to automatically download and install updates, regardless of whether or not they had specifically requested the upgrade. Microsoft officially confirmed the change, claiming it was "an industry practice that reduces the time for installation and ensures device readiness." This move was criticized by users with data caps or devices with low storage capacity, as resources were consumed by the automatic downloads of up to 6 GB of data. Other critics argued that Microsoft should not have triggered any downloading of Windows 10 installation files without user consent.

In October 2015, Windows 10 began to appear as an "Optional" update on the Windows Update interface, but pre-selected for installation on some systems. A Microsoft spokesperson said that this was a mistake, and that the download would no longer be pre-selected by default. However, on October 29, 2015, Microsoft announced that it planned to classify Windows 10 as a "recommended" update in the Windows Update interface sometime in 2016, which would cause an automatic download of installation files and a one-time prompt with a choice to install to appear. In December 2015, it was reported that a new advertising dialog had begun to appear, only containing "Upgrade now" and "Upgrade tonight" buttons, and no obvious method to decline installation besides the close button.

In March 2016, some users also alleged that their Windows 7 and 8.1 devices had automatically begun upgrading to Windows 10 without their consent. In June 2016, the GWX dialog's behavior changed to make closing the window imply a consent to a scheduled upgrade. In December 2016, Microsoft's chief marketing officer Chris Capossela admitted that the company had "gone too far" by using these tactics, stating "we know we want people to be running Windows 10 from a security perspective, but finding the right balance where you're not stepping over the line of being too aggressive is something we tried and for a lot of the year I think we got it right."

On January 21, 2016, Microsoft was sued in small claims court by a user whose computer had attempted to upgrade to Windows 10 without her consent shortly after the release of the operating system. The upgrade failed, and her computer was left in a broken state thereafter, which disrupted the ability to run her travel agency. The court ruled in favor of the user and awarded her $10,000 in damages, but Microsoft appealed. However, in May 2016, Microsoft dropped the appeal and chose to pay the damages. Shortly after the suit was reported on by the Seattle Times, Microsoft confirmed it was updating the GWX software once again to add more explicit options for opting out of a free Windows 10 upgrade; the final notification was a full-screen pop-up window notifying users of the impending end of the free upgrade offer, and contained "Remind me later", "Do not notify me again" and "Notify me three more times" as options.

In March 2019, Microsoft announced that it would display notifications informing users on Windows 7 devices of the upcoming end of extended support for the platform, and direct users to a website urging them to upgrade to Windows 10 or purchase new hardware. This dialog will be similar to the previous Windows 10 upgrade prompts, but will not explicitly mention Windows 10.

=== Privacy and data collection ===
Privacy advocates and other critics have expressed concern regarding Windows 10's privacy policies and its collection and use of customer data. Under the default "Express" settings, Windows 10 is configured to send various information to Microsoft and other parties, including the collection of user contacts, calendar data, and "associated input data" to personalize "speech, typing, and inking input", typing and inking data to improve recognition, allowing apps to use a unique "advertising ID" for analytics and advertising personalization (functionality introduced by Windows 8.1) and allow apps to request the user's location data and send this data to Microsoft and "trusted partners" to improve location detection (Windows 8 had similar settings, except that location data collection did not include "trusted partners"). Users can opt out from most of this data collection, but telemetry data for error reporting and usage is also sent to Microsoft, and this cannot be disabled on non-Enterprise editions of Windows 10. Microsoft's privacy policy states, however, that "Basic"-level telemetry data is anonymized and cannot be used to identify an individual user or device. The use of Cortana also requires the collection of data "such as Your PC location, data from your calendar, the apps you use, data from your emails and text messages, who you call, your contacts and how often you interact with them on Your PC" to personalize its functionality.

Rock Paper Shotgun writer Alec Meer argued that Microsoft's intent for this data collection lacked transparency, stating that "there is no world in which 45 pages of policy documents and opt-out settings split across 13 different settings screens and an external website constitutes 'real transparency'." Joel Hruska of ExtremeTech wrote that "the company that brought us the 'Scroogled' campaign now hoovers up your data in ways that would make Google jealous." However, it was also pointed out that the requirement for such vast usage of customer data had become a norm, citing the increased reliance on cloud computing and other forms of external processing, as well as similar data collection requirements for services on mobile devices such as Google Now and Siri. In August 2015, Russian politician Nikolai Levichev called for Windows 10 to be banned from use within the Russian government, as it sends user data to servers in the United States. The Russian government had passed a federal law requiring all online services to store the data of Russian users on servers within the country by September 2016 or be blocked. Writing for ZDNet, Ed Bott said that the lack of complaints by businesses about privacy in Windows 10 indicated "how utterly normal those privacy terms are in 2015." In a Computerworld editorial, Preston Gralla said that "the kind of information Windows 10 gathers is no different from what other operating systems gather. But Microsoft is held to a different standard than other companies".

The Microsoft Services agreement reads that the company's online services may automatically "download software updates or configuration changes, including those that prevent you from accessing the Services, playing counterfeit games, or using unauthorized hardware peripheral devices." Critics interpreted this statement as implying that Microsoft would scan for and delete unlicensed software installed on devices running Windows 10. However, others pointed out that this agreement was specifically for Microsoft online services such as Microsoft account, Office 365, Skype, as well as Xbox Live, and that the offending passage most likely referred to digital rights management on Xbox consoles and first-party games, and not plans to police pirated video games installed on Windows 10 PCs. Despite this, some torrent trackers announced plans to block Windows 10 users, also arguing that the operating system could send information to anti-piracy groups that are affiliated with Microsoft. Writing about these allegations, Ed Bott of ZDNet compared Microsoft's privacy policy to Apple's and Google's and concluded that he "[did not] see anything that looks remotely like Big Brother." Columnist Kim Komando argued that "Microsoft might in the future run scans and disable software or hardware it sees as a security threat", consistent with the Windows 10 update policy.

In September 2019, Microsoft hid the option to create a local account during a fresh installation if a PC is connected to the internet. This move was criticized by users who did not want to use an online Microsoft account. Additionally, in Windows 10 Home, the first Microsoft account linked to the primary user's account can no longer be unlinked, but other users can unlink their own Microsoft accounts from their user accounts.

In late-July 2020, Windows Defender began to classify modifications of the hosts file that block Microsoft telemetry servers as being a severe security risk.

== See also ==
- Comparison of operating systems
- History of operating systems
- List of Microsoft Windows versions
- List of operating systems
- Microsoft Windows version history

== Notes ==
Preceded by Windows 8	Windows 10; 2015	Succeeded by Windows 11
