= Microsoft Edge (series of web browsers) =

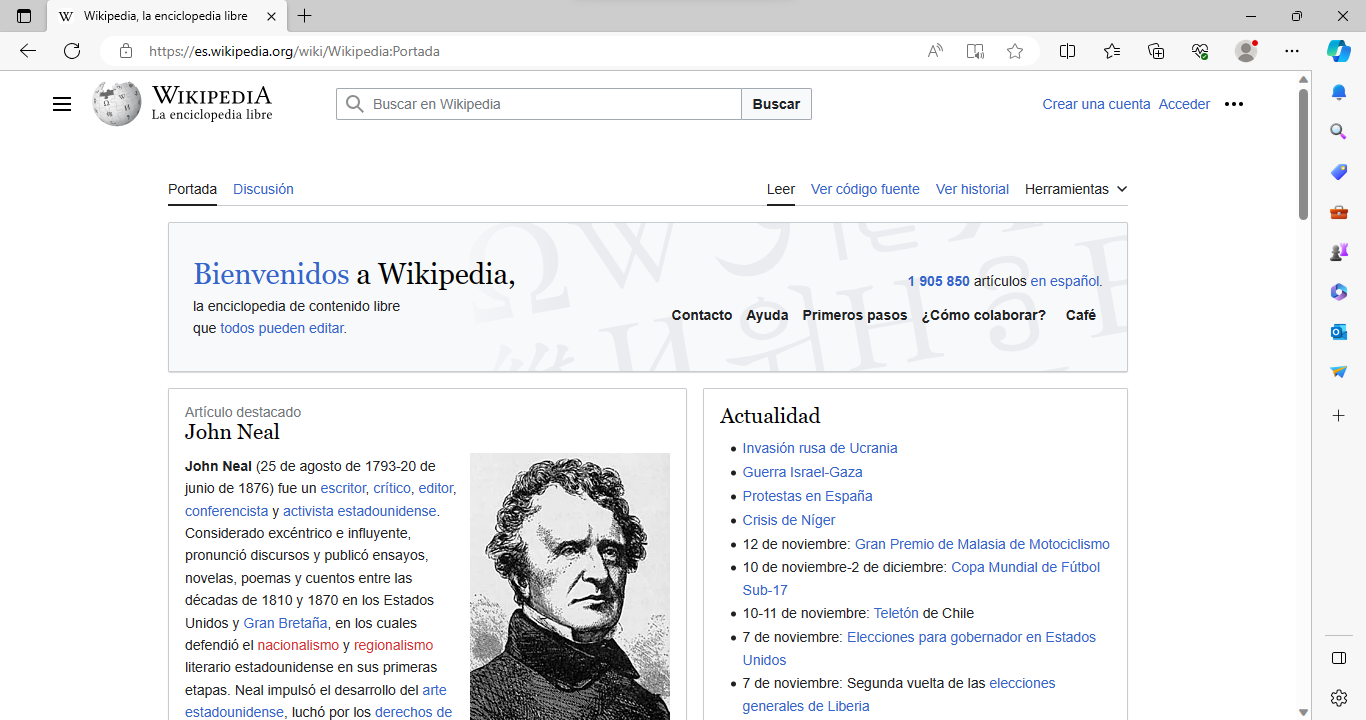
Spanish Wikipedia viewed from Microsoft [New] Edge browser on Windows 11

Microsoft Edge may refer to one or both of two distinct graphical web browsers developed by Microsoft, which include:

- Microsoft Edge Legacy, based on Microsoft's proprietary browser engine EdgeHTML, formerly known as simply "Microsoft Edge", released on July 29, 2015, now discontinued
- Microsoft Edge, based on the Chromium open-source project, also known as "The New Microsoft Edge", superseded Edge Legacy, released on January 15, 2020, current
