= List of features removed in Windows 11 =

Windows 11 is the latest major release of the Windows NT operating system and the successor of Windows 10. Some features of the operating system were removed in comparison to Windows 10, and further changes in older features have occurred within subsequent feature updates to Windows 11. The removed features are listed as follows (both original and later releases).

== Features removed in original release ==
=== Bundled software ===
==== No longer available ====
Windows 11 moved away from the following applications that are no longer available.

- Internet Explorer (Note: Internet Explorer is in fact seemingly still present but hidden, and can be opened via the Addons menu under Internet Options. Some third-party applications reportedly have no trouble accessing it.) (Note: Internet Explorer mode is still available in Microsoft Edge of Windows 11)
- Wallet
- Windows Mixed Reality
- Skype (replaced by Microsoft Teams)
- 3D Viewer (replaced by Babylon.js)
- Paint 3D

==== Not bundled, but available ====
Windows 11 moved away from the following applications that can still be installed from the Microsoft Store.

- OneNote for Windows 10

=== Windows shell ===
The following parts of the Windows shell are no longer available in Windows 11.

- Lock screen's quick status
- Toggleable tablet mode (now is automatically enabled on touch devices)
- Timeline feature in Task View
- Save Search option in File Explorer

In addition:

- The touch keyboard no longer docks in screens larger than 18 inches.
- Windows no longer synchronizes desktop wallpapers across devices with a Microsoft account.
- Windows no longer shows a small preview of images or videos on folder thumbnails. Instead, it shows the generic folder icon for any folder containing images or videos. (Note: This change has been reverted in February 2022 insider builds.)

==== Start menu ====
Some functionality from the Start menu was removed and replaced with other features.

- Folders and groups (Note: Reinstated in February 2022 insider builds)
- Live tiles, but the Widgets panel provides portions of what the live tiles of Windows 10's bundled apps provided
- Recent and pinned files on pinned apps

==== Taskbar ====
The following taskbar features are no longer available as of Windows 11: (some of these may still be possible with registry tweaking)

- Support for moving the taskbar to the top, left, or right of the screen (Reinstated in Windows 11 build 26300.8493)
- Support for using the taskbar in full screen
- Support for changing the size of the taskbar or its icons (Fully reinstated in Windows 11 build 26300.8493)
- "Time" is not displayed in the calendar when clicking on the "Date/Time" on taskbar (Reinstated in 2026)
- Scheduled events are not displayed in the calendar when opened
- The option to show or hide Windows shell's tray icons (Only third-party icons can be hidden or shown)
- All settings and shortcuts in the taskbar's context menu (Only a shortcut to the taskbar settings area of the Settings app is available.)
- The network and audio flyouts have been consolidated into a new settings flyout
- "Some icons in the System Tray", although Microsoft doesn't specify which
- Support for third-party taskbar components (deskbands)
- The upward swipe gesture for jumplists
- Ability to move the system tray from the primary monitor
- The People button (The "Chat" button powered by Microsoft Teams takes its place.)
- The News and Interests panel (the "Widgets" panel serves the same purpose.)
- Action Center (two separate flyouts take its place: "Notification Center" and "Quick Settings")
- Support for showing one icon per app window on the taskbar (reinstated in May 2023; option merged with showing labels)
- Support for showing window labels on the taskbar (Reinstated in May 2023; option merged with separating window icons)
- Support for bringing an app into focus by dragging a file to its button (reinstated in February 2022 insider builds)
- Task Manager can no longer be opened by right-clicking the taskbar (reinstated in September 2022 insider builds)
- Ability to peek at the desktop by hovering the mouse cursor over the Show Desktop button
- Ability to display the seconds on the current time removed (Reinstated in November 2022)
- Support for adding toolbars such as the Address and Links bars (apart from 3rd party software)
- Expanding Taskbar to two or more levels
- Holding shift while right-clicking on an app icon for which multiple windows are open no longer shows a menu allowing the user to minimize, restore, cascade, or stack all open windows for that app

=== Settings ===
- File History can only be configured using the legacy Control Panel application, which does not support adding custom folders to the set of protected folders as the Settings app in Windows 10 did.
- The option to simultaneously set a program as the default for all file associations it can handle is no longer available.

=== Architecture and other features ===
Windows 11 is only available for the x86-64 and ARM64 CPU architectures, as Microsoft is no longer offering a Windows build for IA-32 x86 and ARMv7 systems. In addition, NTVDM and the 16-bit Windows on Windows subsystems, which allowed 32-bit versions of Windows to directly run 16-bit DOS and Windows programs, have also been revoked.

User-mode scheduling (UMS), available on x64 versions Windows 7 and later, was a lightweight mechanism allowing applications to schedule their own threads, without involvement from the system scheduler. This feature is not included with Windows 11.

=== Themes ===
The default Windows 10 and Flowers themes have been removed.

== Features removed in later releases ==
=== 2022 Update ===
- The Focus assist feature has been split to Focus and Do Not Disturb.
- Attempting to run 32-bit apps on ARM64 systems that do not support 32-bit mode will now fail gracefully with an error rather than crash.

=== 2023 Update ===
- Microsoft Teams Chat icon on taskbar is removed.

=== 2024 Update ===
- WordPad is no longer bundled with Windows 11, but is still included in legacy installations.
- A 64-bit CPU version 2 supporting SSE4.2 and POPCNT CPU instructions whose support was first implemented in Windows 7 and Windows Server 2008 R2 is now required.
- An ARMv8.1 CPU is now required, dropping unofficial support for ARMv8.0.
- ARM variants drop support for 32-bit applications.
- WMI command line tool (WMIC) is no longer installed by default. It has been made as an optional feature installable via Windows Settings.
- It is no longer possible to add or remove items from Quick Settings. However, items can be rearranged between at least 2 pages.
- The Windows 10 taskbar code, which third-party customization tools utilize, has been removed. Taskbar for the SYSTEM account is no longer supported as the taskbar is only visible after Explorer is fully initialized, but it fails to fully initialize under SYSTEM.

== See also ==
- New features by Windows version:
  - XP
  - Vista
  - 7
  - 8
  - 10
  - 11
- Removed features by Windows version:
  - XP
  - Vista
  - 7
  - 8
  - 10
  - 11
