= Features new to Windows 8 =

The transition from Windows 7 to Windows 8 introduced a number of new features across various aspects of the operating system. These include a greater focus on optimizing the operating system for touchscreen-based devices (such as tablets) and cloud computing.

== Development platform ==
=== Language and standards support ===
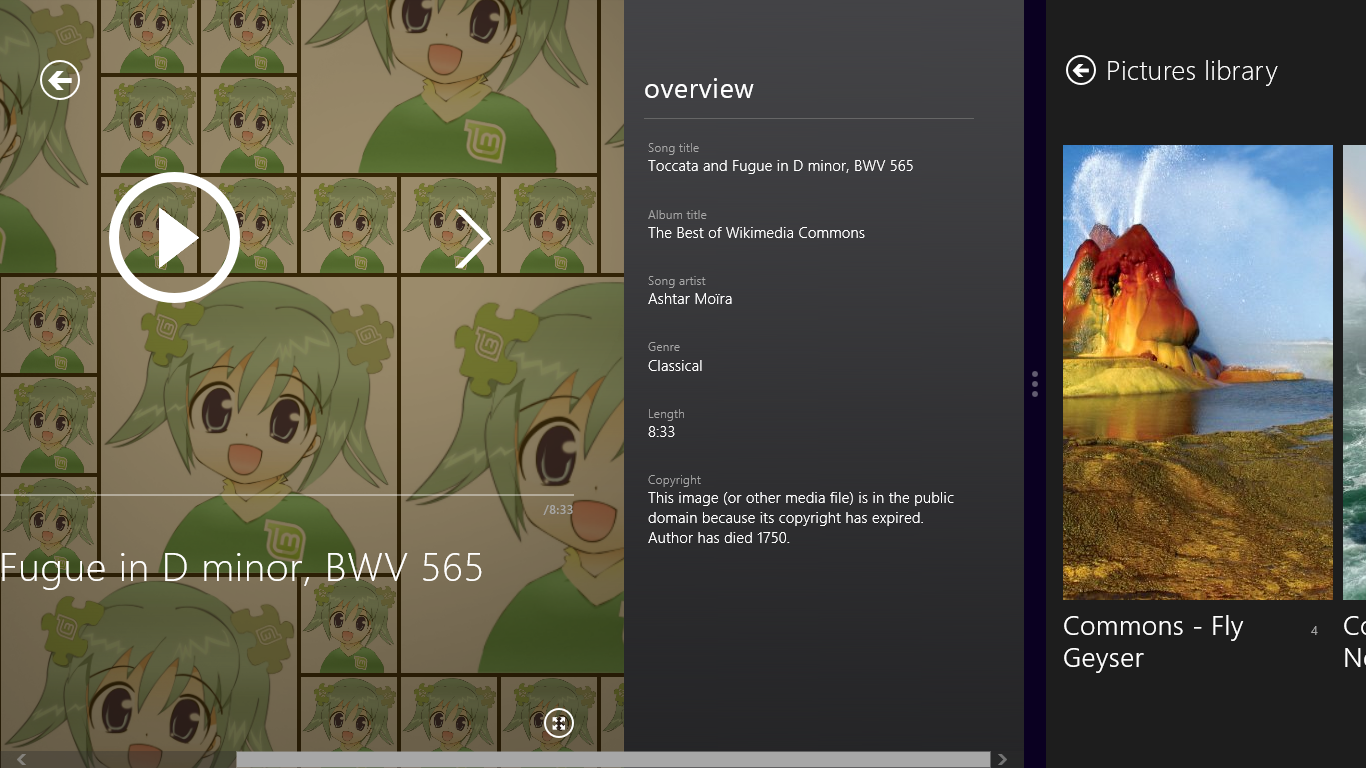
Snap feature: Xbox Music app, along Photos app snapped into a sidebar to the right side of the screen

Windows 8 introduces the new Windows Runtime (WinRT) platform, which can be used to create a new type of application officially known as Windows Store apps and commonly called Metro-style apps. Such apps run within a secure sandbox and share data with other apps through common APIs. WinRT, being a COM-based API, allows for the use of various programming languages to code apps, including C++, C++/CX, C#, Visual Basic .NET, or HTML5 and JavaScript. Metro-style apps are packaged and distributed via APPX, a new file format for package management. Unlike desktop applications, Metro-style apps can be sideloaded, subject to licensing conditions. Windows 8.1 Update allows for sideloading apps on all Windows 8.1 Pro devices joined to an Active Directory domain.

In Windows 8 up to two apps may snap to the side of a widescreen display to allow multi-tasking, forming a sidebar that separates the apps. In Windows 8.1, apps can continually be resized to the desired width. Snapped apps may occupy half of the screen. Large screens allow up to four apps to be snapped. Upon launching an app, Windows allows the user to pick which snapped view the app should open into.

The term "Metro-style apps" referred to "Metro", a design language prominently used by Windows 8 and other recent Microsoft products. Reports surfaced that Microsoft employees were told to stop using the term due to potential trademark issues with an unspecified partner. A Microsoft spokesperson however, denied these reports and stated that "Metro-style" was merely a codename for the new application platform.

Windows 8 introduces APIs to support near field communication (NFC) on Windows 8 devices, allowing functionality like launching URLs/applications and sharing of information between devices via NFC.

=== Windows Store ===
Windows Store is a digital distribution platform built into Windows 8, which in a manner similar to Apple's App Store and Google Play, allows for the distribution and purchase of apps designed for Windows 8. Developers will still be able to advertise desktop software through Windows Store as well. To ensure that they are secure and of a high quality, Windows Store will be the only means of distributing WinRT-based apps for consumer-oriented versions of Windows 8.

In Windows 8.1, Windows Store features a redesigned interface with improved app discovery and recommendations and offers automatic updates for apps.

== Shell and user interface ==
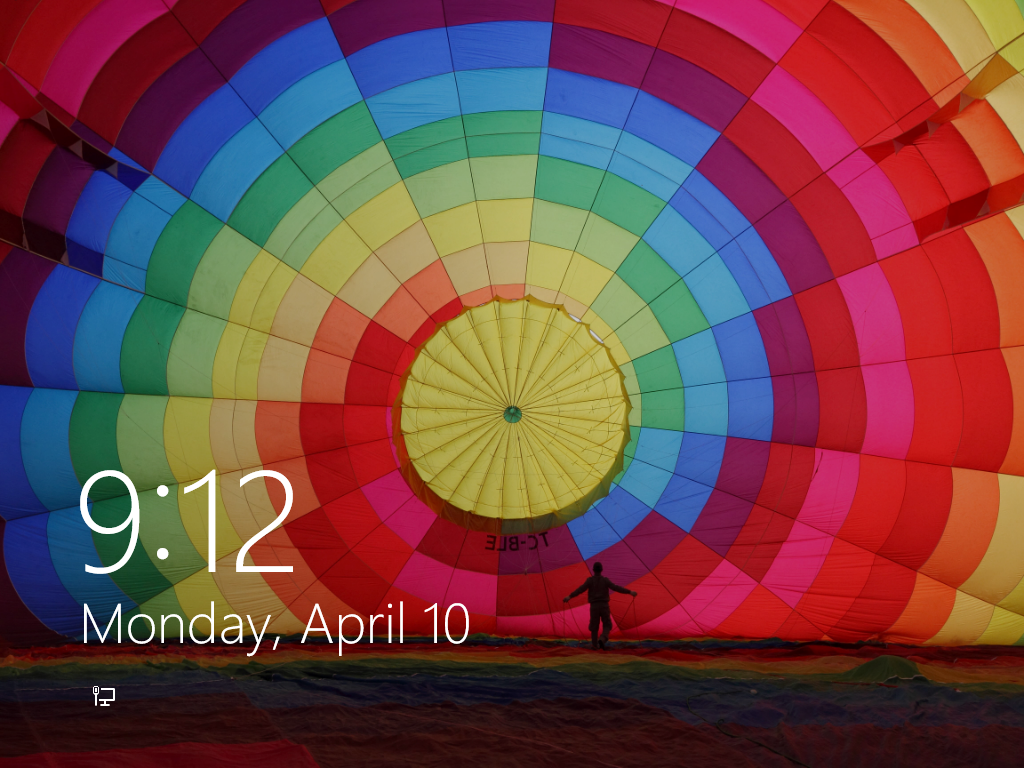
The revised lock screen interface in Windows 8

Windows 8 features a redesigned user interface built upon the Metro design language, with optimizations for touchscreens.

Metro-style apps can either run in a full-screen environment, or be snapped to the side of a screen alongside another app or the desktop; snapping requires a screen resolution of 1366×768 or higher. Windows 8.1 lowers the snapping requirement to a screen resolution of 1024x768. Users can switch between apps and the desktop by clicking on the top left corner or by swiping the left side of the touchscreen to invoke a sidebar that displays all currently opened Metro-style apps. Right-clicking on the upper left corner provides a context menu with options to switch between open apps. The traditional desktop is accessible from a tile on the Start screen or by launching a desktop app. The Alt+Tab ↹ shortcut cycles through all programs, regardless of type.

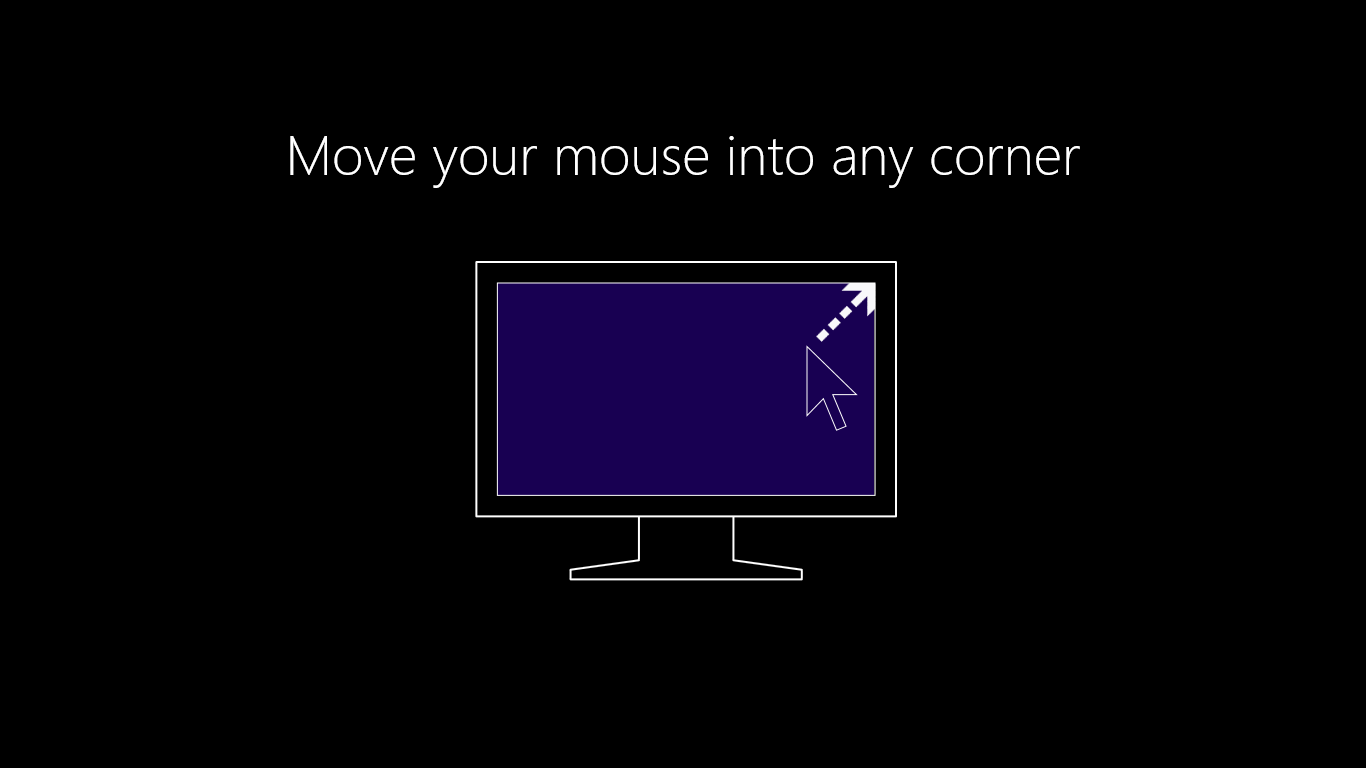
The tutorial that appears after the installation of Windows 8 and when a new user signs in for the first time

The interface also incorporates a taskbar on the right side of the screen known as "the charms" (lowercase), which can be accessed from any app or the desktop by sliding from the right edge of a touchscreen or compatible touchpad, by moving the mouse cursor to one of the right corners of the screen, or by pressing ⊞ Win+C. The charms include Search, Share, Start, Devices and Settings charms. The Start charm invokes or dismisses the Start screen. Other charms invoke context-sensitive sidebars that can be used to access app and system functionality. Because of the aforementioned changes involving the use of hot corners, user interface navigation in Windows 8 is fundamentally different when compared with previous versions of Windows. To assist new users of the operating system, Microsoft incorporated a tutorial that appears during the installation of Windows 8, and also during the first sign-in of a new user account, which visually instructs users to move their mouse cursor into any corner of the screen (or swipe the corners on devices with touchscreens) to interact with the operating system. The tutorial can be disabled so that it does not appear for new user accounts. Windows 8.1 introduces navigation hints with instructions that are displayed during the first use of the operating system, and also includes a help and support app.

In Windows 8.1, the aforementioned hotspots in the upper right and the upper left corners can be disabled.

Pressing ⊞ Win+X or right-clicking on the bottom left corner of the screen opens the Quick Link menu. This menu contains shortcuts to frequently used areas such as Control Panel, File Explorer, Programs and Features, Run, Search, Power Options and Task Manager. In Windows 8.1, the Quick Link menu includes options to shut down or restart a device.

Windows 8.1 Update introduced changes that facilitate mouse-oriented means of switching between and closing Metro-style apps, patterned upon the mechanics used by desktop programs in the Windows user interlace. In lieu of the recent apps sidebar, computer icons for opened apps can be displayed on the taskbar; as with desktop programs, shortcuts to apps can also be pinned to the taskbar. When a mouse is connected, an auto-hiding titlebar with minimize and close buttons is displayed within apps when the mouse is moved toward the top of the screen.

=== Bundled apps ===
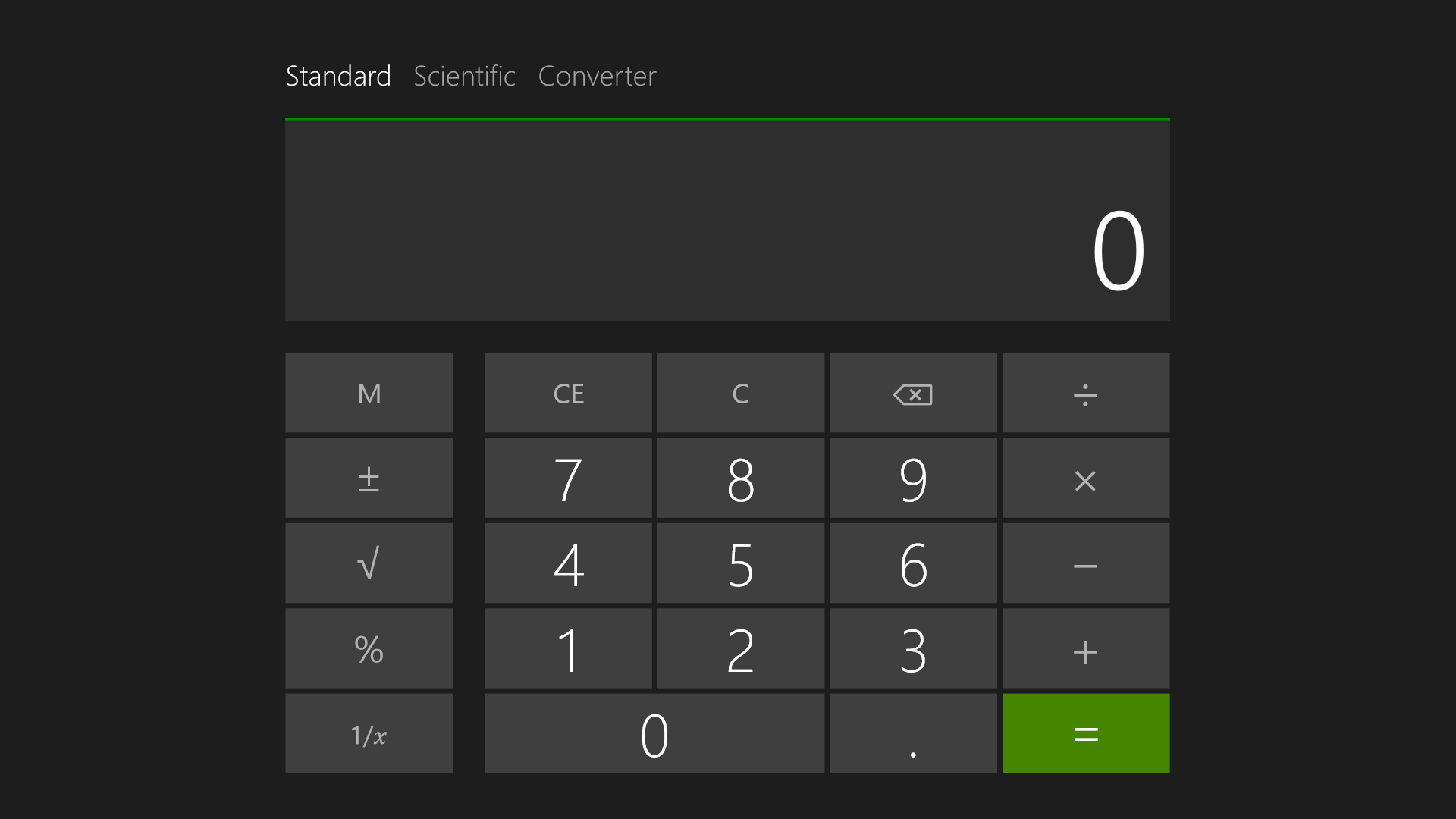
The Calculator app running in Windows 8.1

A number of apps are included in the standard installation of Windows 8, including Mail (an email client), People (a contact manager), Calendar (a calendaring app), Messaging (an IM client), Photos (an image viewer), Music (an audio player), Video (a video player), Camera (a webcam or digital camera client), SkyDrive (later renamed as OneDrive due to legal reasons), Reader (an PDF, XPS and e-book reader), and six other apps that expose Bing services (Search, News, Finance, Weather, Travel, and Sports).

Windows 8.1 adds Calculator, Alarms & Clock, Sound Recorder, Reading List, Food & Drink, Health & Fitness, Help + Tips, Scan, and a file manager integrated in the SkyDrive app.

Windows 8 also includes a Metro-style system component called PC Settings which exposes a small portion of Control Panel settings. Windows 8.1 improves this component to include more options that were previously exclusive to Control Panel. Windows 8.1 Update adds additional options to PC Settings.

=== Start screen ===
The new Start screen in Windows 8 replaces the Start menu seen in previous versions of Windows.

Windows 8 introduces a new form of start menu called Start screen, which resembles the home screen of Windows Phone, and is shown in place of the desktop on startup. The Start screen serves as the primary method of launching applications and consists of a grid of app tiles which can be arranged into columnar groups; groups can be arranged with or without group names. App tiles can either be small (taking up 1 square) or large (taking up 2 squares) in size and can also display dynamic content provided by their corresponding apps, such as notifications and slide shows. Users can arrange individual app tiles or entire groups. An additional section of the Start screen called "All Apps" can be accessed via a right click from the mouse or an upward swipe and will display all installed apps categorized by their names. A semantic zoom feature is available for both the Start screen and "All Apps" view which enables users to target a specific area or group on the screen. The Start screen can uninstall apps directly.

Windows 8.1 makes the following changes to the Start screen:

- The "All Apps" section, now accessed with a hidden downward arrow or upward touch gesture, features a visible search bar which can display results for apps or other items. The section is dismissed by a similar button with an upward arrow. An option to display the "All Apps" section automatically instead of the Start screen is available.
- On high-resolution display monitors with sufficiently large physical screen sizes, an option to display additional tiles on the Start screen is available.
- Start screen tiles can be locked in place to prevent accidental manipulation of tiles.
- The uninstall command allows Windows Store apps to be uninstalled from multiple computers.
- More size options for live tiles on Start screen: small, medium, wide, and large. The "small" size is one quarter of the default size in Windows 8.
- Expanded color options on the Start screen, which now allows users to customize a color and a shade of one's own choice instead of choosing from limited colors.
- New background options for the Start screen, including animated backgrounds and the ability to use the desktop wallpaper.
- Enhanced synchronization settings, including those for app tile arrangement, tile sizes, and background.
- In a multi-monitor configuration, Windows 8.1 can optionally display the Start screen only on the primarily display monitor instead of the currently active monitor when the ⊞ Win key is pressed.
- Multiple desktop applications can be selected from the Start screen and pinned to the taskbar at once, or multiple desktop applications and Metro-style apps can be selected from the "All Apps" view and pinned to the Start screen at once. Windows 8.1 Update augments this capability by allowing Metro-style apps to be pinned to the taskbar. The Start menu in previous versions of Windows allowed only one desktop application to be selected and/or pinned at a time.
- By default, Windows 8.1 no longer displays recently installed apps and their related entries on the Start screen; users must manually pin these items.
- Windows 8.1 introduces options to categorize apps listed within the "All Apps" section of the Start screen. Apps can be categorized by their name, the date they were installed, their frequency of use, or based on their categories. When sorted by category, desktop applications can optionally be prioritized within the interface. Windows 8.1 Update allows additional app tiles to be displayed within the "All Apps" section of the Start screen.
- The ability to highlight recently installed apps has been enhanced in Windows 8.1 Update, which now displays the total number of recently installed apps within the lower-left corner of the Start screen in addition to highlighting. In contrast, the Start menu interface included in previous versions of Windows only highlighted apps. Windows 8.1 Update also enables semantic zoom upon clicking or tapping the title of an app category.

Windows 8.1 reverts two changes that were featured in Windows 8. Windows 8 removed the Start button on the taskbar in favor of other ways of invoking the Start screen. Windows 8.1 restores this button. Windows 8 also showed the Start screen upon logon, as opposed to other editions of Windows that show the desktop. In Windows 8.1, user may now choose which one to see first. Windows 8.1 Update boots to the desktop by default on non-tablet devices and introduces the ability to switch to the taskbar from the Start screen or from an open Metro-style app by directing the mouse cursor toward the bottom of the screen.

Windows 8.1 introduces a new "slide to shutdown" option which allows users to drag their partially revealed lock screen image toward the bottom of the screen to shut down the operating system. Windows 8.1 Update introduces a visible power button on the Start screen. This power button does not appear on all hardware device types. By default, new account profiles in Windows 8.1 Update also receive four additional tiles pinned to the Start screen: This PC, PC Settings, Documents, and Pictures. In Windows RT, only the PC Settings tile is added.

=== Search ===
In Windows 8, searching from the Start screen or clicking on the Search charm will display search results within a full-screen interface. Unlike previous versions of Windows where searching from the Start menu returned results from multiple sources simultaneously, Windows 8 searches through individual categories: apps, settings, and files. By default, Windows 8 searches for apps after a user begins searching from the Start screen or Search charm, but can also search other categories from the user interface or via keyboard shortcuts. Pressing ⊞ Win++Q opens the Search charm to search for apps, ⊞ Win++F searches for files, and ⊞ Win++W searches for settings. Search queries can also be redirected between specific categories or apps after being entered. When searching for apps, Windows 8 will display a list of apps that support the Search charm; frequently used apps will be prioritized and users can pin individual apps so that they always appear. The Search charm can also search directly within apps if a user redirects an entered search query to a specific app or presses ⊞ Win++Q from within an app that is already open. When searching for files, Windows 8 will highlight words or phrases that match a search query and provide suggestions based on the content and properties of files that appear. Information about the files themselves, such as associated programs and sizes, appear directly beneath filenames. If a user hovers over a file with the mouse cursor or long presses with a finger a tooltip will appear and display additional information.

In Windows 8.1, searching no longer opens a full-screen interface; results are instead displayed in a Metro-style flyout interface. Windows 8.1 also reinstates unified local search results, and can optionally provide results from Bing. Dubbed "Smart Search," Windows 8.1 and Bing can optionally analyze a user's search habits to return relevant content that is stored locally and from the Internet. When enabled, Smart Search exposes additional search categories within the user interface: web images and web videos, and can be accessed via a new keyboard shortcut, ⊞ Win++S+. A new full screen "hero" interface powered by Bing can display aggregated multimedia (such as photos, YouTube videos, songs/albums on Xbox Music) and other content (such as news articles and Wikipedia entries) related to a search query. Like its predecessor, Windows 8.1 allows users to search through setting and file categories, but the option to search through a category for apps is removed from the interface; the keyboard shortcut previously associated with this functionality, ⊞ Win++Q, now displays unified search results. The Search charm also can no longer search from within apps directly or display a list of compatible apps. To search for content within apps, users must first open an app and, if available, use a search feature from within that app's interface.

Windows 8.1 Update enhances the Bing Smart Search feature by providing support for natural language queries, which can detect misspellings and display apps or settings relevant to a query. For example, typing "get apps for Windows" will display a shortcut to the Windows Store. Windows 8.1 Update also introduces a visible search button on the Start screen that acts as a shortcut to the Metro-style flyout interface.

The Kind property introduced in Windows Vista to express a more friendly notion of file type has been expanded to include support for Playlist (where items are playlists) in Windows 8. In Windows 8.1, Unknown (where the kind of item is not known) is also introduced.

=== User login ===
Windows 8 introduces a redesigned lock screen interface based on the Metro design language. The lock screen displays a customizable background image, the current date and time, notifications from apps, and detailed app status or updates. Two new login methods optimized for touch screens are also available, including a four-digit PIN, or a "picture password," which users allow the use of certain gestures performed on a selected picture to log in. These gestures will take into account the shape, the start and end points, as well as the direction. However, the shapes and gestures are limited to tapping and tracing a line or circle. Microsoft found that limiting the gestures increased the speed of sign-ins by three times compared to allowing freeform methods. Wrong gestures will always deny a login, and it will lock out the PC after five unsuccessful attempts, until a text password is provided.

Windows 8.1 introduces the ability to display a photo slide show on the lock screen. The feature can display images from local or remote directories, and includes additional options to use photos optimized for the current screen resolution, to disable the slide show while the device is running on battery power, and to display the lock screen slide show instead of turning off the screen after a period of user inactivity. The lock screen can also display interactive toast notifications. As examples, users can answer calls or instant messages received from Skype contacts, or dismiss alarm notifications from the lock screen. Users can also take photos without dismissing the lock screen.

=== Notifications ===
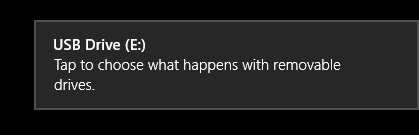
A Windows 8 toast notification informing the user that a removable drive has been attached. Clicking or tapping the notification brings up the AutoPlay dialog, allowing users to configure actions that Windows should take after the insertion of a removable media device.

Windows 8 introduces new forms of notifications for Metro-style apps and for certain events in File Explorer.

- Toast notifications: alert the user to specific events, such as the insertion of removable media
- Tile notifications: display dynamic information on the Start screen, such as weather forecasts and news updates
- Badge notifications: display numeric counters with a value from 1-99 that indicate certain events, such as the amount of unread e-mail messages or amount of available updates for a particular app. Additional information may also be displayed by a badge notification, such as the status of an Xbox Music app.

The PC Settings component includes options to globally disable all toast notifications, app notifications on the lock screen, or notification sounds; notifications can also be disabled on a per-app basis. In the Settings charm, Windows 8 provides additional options to suppress toast notifications during 1 hour, 3 hour, or 8 hour time intervals.

Windows 8.1 introduces a Quiet Hours feature, also available on Windows Phone, that allows users to suppress notifications based on the time of day (e.g., notifications can be disabled from 12:00 AM to 6:00 PM).

=== Microsoft account integration ===
Windows 8 allows users to link profiles with a Microsoft account to provide additional functionality, such as the synchronization of user data and settings, including those belonging to the desktop, and allows for integration with other Microsoft services such as Xbox Live, Xbox Music, Xbox Video (for gaming and multimedia) and SkyDrive online file storage.

=== Display screen ===
Windows 8.1 displaying the multi-monitor taskbar in "Duplicated on all taskbars" mode

Windows 8 includes improved support for multi-monitor configurations; the taskbar can now optionally be shown on multiple displays, and each display can also show its own dedicated taskbar. In addition, options are available which can prevent taskbar buttons from appearing on certain monitors. Wallpapers can also be spanned across multiple displays, or each display can have its own separate wallpaper.

Windows 8.1 includes improved support for high-resolution monitors. A desktop scaling feature now helps resize the items on the desktop to solve the visibility problems on screens with a very high native resolution. Windows 8.1 also introduces per-display DPI scaling and High DPI support, and provides an option to scale to 200%.

=== File Explorer ===
The new File Explorer interface in Windows 8

Windows Explorer, which has been renamed as File Explorer, now incorporates a ribbon toolbar, designed to bring forward the most commonly used commands for easy access. The "Up" button (which advances the user back a level in the folder hierarchy) that was removed from Explorer after Windows XP has also been restored. Additionally, File Explorer features a redesigned preview pane that takes advantage of widescreen layouts. File Explorer also provides a built-in function for mounting ISO, IMG, and VHD files as virtual drives. For easier management of files and folders, Windows 8 introduces the ability to move selected files or folders via drag and drop from a parent folder into a subfolder listed within the breadcrumb hierarchy of the address bar in File Explorer.

Progress windows for file operations have also been redesigned; offering the ability to show multiple operations at once, a graph for tracking transfer speeds, and the ability to pause and resume a file transfer. A new interface has also been introduced for managing file name collisions in a file operation, allowing users to easily control which conflicting files are copied.

Libraries introduced in Windows 7 can now have their icons changed through the user interface; previously, users had to change icons by manually editing configuration files. With Windows 8.1., libraries can now also include removable storage devices; previously, adding removable storage devices to libraries was not supported. Windows 8.1, however, no longer creates any default libraries for new users, and does not display the Libraries listing in File Explorer by default. Instead, Windows 8.1 introduces shortcuts to the default user profile folders (Documents, Downloads, Pictures, etc.) within the This PC location of File Explorer. The libraries can be enabled in the Options menu.

HomeGroup has been updated in Windows 8 to display in the navigation pane the user profile photo of each member sharing content in the homegroup; in Windows 7, only a generic user icon for each user was displayed in the navigation pane.

=== Internet Explorer ===
Windows 8 ships with Internet Explorer 10, which can run as either a desktop program (where it operates similarly to Internet Explorer 9), or as an app with a new full-screen interface optimized for use on touchscreens. Internet Explorer 10 also contains an integrated version of Flash Player, which will be available in full on the desktop, and in a limited form within the "Metro" app.

Windows 8.1 ships with Internet Explorer 11 which includes tab syncing, WebGL and SPDY support, along with expanded developer tools. The Metro version also adds access to favorites and split-screen snapping of multiple tabs; an additional option to always display the address bar and tabs is also available. The Metro version can also detect and highlight phone numbers on a web page and turn them into clickable links that, when clicked, initiate a call with a compatible app such as Skype.

=== Task Manager ===
The new Task Manager in Windows 8 offers a detailed look at how system resources are being used.

Windows 8 includes an overhauled version of Task Manager, which features the following changes:

- Task Manager defaults to a simple view which only displays a list of computer programs with a window. The expanded view is an updated version of the previous Task Managers with several tabs.
- Resource utilization in the Processes tab is shown using a heat map, with darker shades of yellow representing heavier use.
- The Performance tab is split into CPU, memory, disk, Ethernet, and wireless network (if applicable) sections. There are overall graphs for each, and clicking on one reaches details for that particular resource
  - The CPU tab no longer displays individual graphs for every logical processor on the system by default. It may show data for each NUMA node.
  - The CPU tab displays simple percentages on heat-mapping tiles to display utilization for systems with many (64 or more, up to 640) logical processors. The color used for these heat maps is blue, with darker color again indicating heavier utilization
  - Hovering the cursor over any logical processor's graph shows the NUMA node of that processor and its ID.
- The new Startup tab lists startup programs and their impact on boot time. Windows Vista included a feature to manage startup applications that was removed in Windows 7.
- The Processes tab now lists application names, application status, and overall usage data for CPU, memory, hard disk, and network resources for each process. A new option to restart File Explorer upon its selection is provided.
  - Task manager recognizes when a Windows Runtime application is in "Suspended" status.
  - The process information found in the Processes tab of the older Task Manager can be found in the Details tab.

=== Touch keyboard ===
Windows 8 introduces a revised virtual (also known as on-screen) keyboard interface optimized for touchscreen devices that includes wider spacing between keys and is designed to prevent common typing errors that occur while using touchscreens. Pressing and holding down a key reveals related keys which can be accessed via a press or swipe, and suggestions for incomplete words are available. Emoji characters are also supported. Windows 8.1 introduces the ability to swipe the space bar in the desired direction of a suggested word to switch between on-screen suggestions.

Windows 8.1 Update introduces a new gesture that allows users to tap twice and hold the second tap to drag and drop highlighted text or objects. A visible option to hide or show the virtual keyboard is also available.

=== Password input ===
Windows 8 displays a "peek" button for password text boxes which can optionally allows users to view passwords as they are entered in order to ensure that they are typed correctly. The feature can be disabled via Group Policy.

== Infrastructure ==
=== File History ===
File History is a continuous data protection component. File History automatically creates incremental backups of files stored in Libraries, including those for users participating in a HomeGroup, and user-specified folders to a different storage device (such as another internal or external hard drive, Storage Space, or network share). Specific revisions of files can then be tracked and restored using the "History" functions in File Explorer. File History replaces both Backup and Restore and Shadow Copy (known in Windows Explorer as "Previous Versions") as the main backup tool of Windows 8. Unlike Shadow Copy, which performs block-level tracking of files, File History utilizes the USN Journal to track changes, and simply copies revisions of files to the backup location. Unlike Backup and Restore, File History cannot back up files encrypted with EFS.

=== Hardware support ===
Windows 8 adds native support for USB 3.0, which allows for faster data transfers and improved power management with compatible devices. This native stack includes support for the newer, more efficient USB Attached SCSI (UAS) protocol, which is turned on by default even for USB 2.0 devices, although these must however have supporting firmware/hardware to take advantage of it. Windows 8.1 enhanced support for power saving features of USB storage devices, but this addition was not without problems, with some poorly implemented hardware degrading user experience by hangs and disconnects. Windows 8 adds support for HID over I2C.

Support for Advanced Format hard drives without emulation is included for the first time.

A port of Windows for the ARM architecture was also created for Windows 8. Known as Windows RT, it is specifically optimized for mobile devices such as tablets. Windows RT is only able to run third-party Windows Store apps, but comes with a preinstalled version of Office 2013 specially redesigned for touchscreen use.

Windows 8.1 improves hardware support with DirectX 11.2.

Windows 8.1 adds native support for NVM Express. Windows 8.1 adds support for Precise Touchpad, which allows operating system to management gestures of USB and I2C touchpads.

Windows 8 adds support for UEFI Secure Boot, and TPM 2.0. UEFI with secure boot enabled is a requirement on computers shipped with Windows 8. Windows 8 adds support for ACPI 5.0. Windows 8 adds a Metro like OS selection screen in its Windows Boot Manager.

=== Installation ===
Alongside the existing WinPE-based Windows Setup (which is used for installations that are initiated by booting from DVD, USB, or network), Upgrade Assistant is offered to provide a simpler and faster process for upgrading to Windows 8 from previous versions of Windows. The program runs a compatibility check to scan the device's hardware and software for Windows 8 compatibility, and then allows the user to purchase, download, generate installation media with a DVD or USB flash drive and install Windows 8. The new installation process also allows users to transfer user data into a clean installation of Windows. A similar program, branded as Windows 8 Setup, is used for installations where the user already has a product key.

Windows 8 implements OEM Activation 3.0, which allows Microsoft to digitally distribute Windows licenses to original equipment manufacturers (OEMs). Windows 8 devices store product keys directly in firmware rather than printed on a Certificate of Authenticity (CoA) sticker. This new system is designed to prevent OEM product keys from being used on computers they are not licensed for, and also allows the installer to automatically detect and accept the product key in the event of re-installation.

Windows 8.1 Update adds a new installation mode known as "WIMBoot", where the WIM image that contains the Windows installation is left compressed rather than being extracted, and the system is configured to use files directly from within the system image. This installation method was primarily designed to reduce the footprint of the Windows installation on devices with small amounts of storage. The system image also doubles as the recovery image, speeding up Refresh and Reset operations. It is only supported in systems with a Unified Extensible Firmware Interface (UEFI), where Windows is located on a solid-state drive or eMMC.

=== Networking ===
Windows 8 incorporates improved support for mobile broadband as a "first-class" method of internet connectivity. Upon the insertion of a SIM card, the operating system will automatically determine the user's carrier and configure relevant connection settings using an Access Point Name database. The operating system can also monitor mobile data usage, and changes its behavior accordingly to reduce bandwidth use on metered networks. Carriers can also offer their own dedicated Windows Store apps for account management, which can also be installed automatically as a part of the connection process. This functionality was demonstrated with an AT&T app, which could also display monthly data usage statistics on its live tile. Windows 8 also reduces the need for third-party drivers and software to implement mobile broadband by providing a generic driver, and by providing an integrated airplane mode option.

Windows 8 supports geolocation. Windows 8.1 adds support for NFC printing, mobile broadband tethering, auto-triggered VPN and geofencing.

Windows 8.1 Update provides options for the "Network" Settings charm to show the estimated data usage for a selected network, and to designate a network as a metered connection.

=== Startup ===
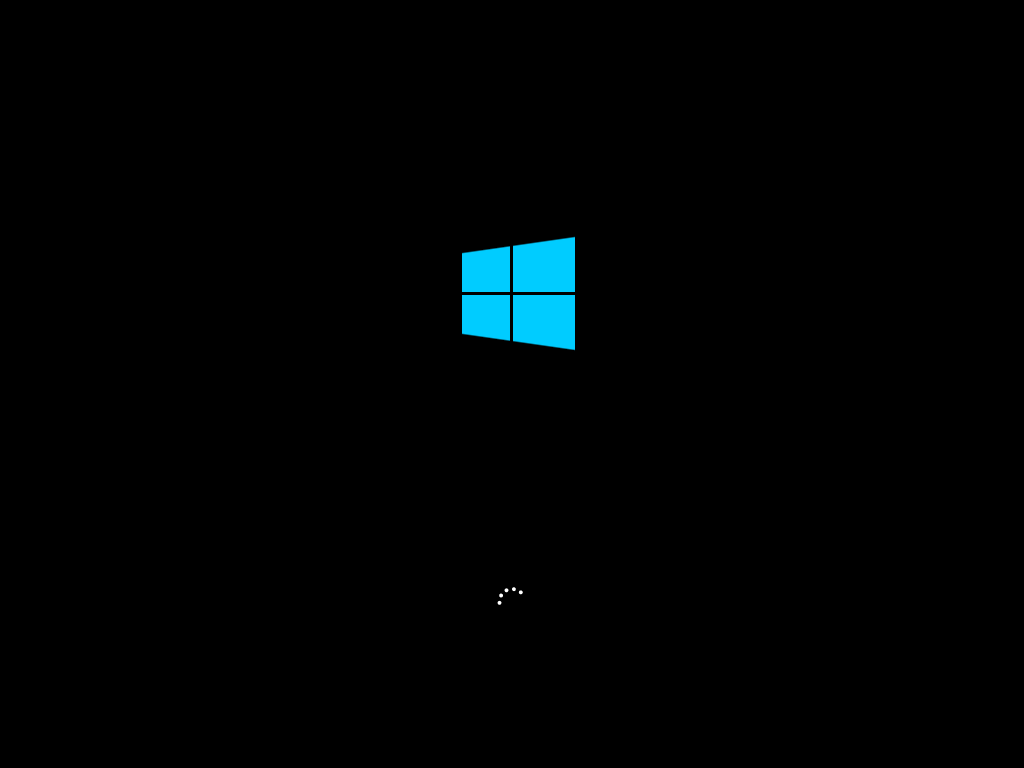
The default Windows 8 boot screen; OEMs can replace the Windows logo above the throbber with their own logo in firmware

Windows 8 defaults to a "Fast startup" mode; when the operating system is shut down, it hibernates the kernel, allowing for a faster boot on the subsequent startup. These improvements are further compounded by using all processor cores during startup by default. To create a more seamless transition between the Power-on self-test and Windows startup process, manufacturers' logos can now be shown on the Windows boot screen on compatible systems with UEFI.

The Advanced Startup menu now uses a graphical interface with mouse and touch support in place of the text-based menu used by previous versions. As the increased boot speed of devices with UEFI can make it difficult to access it using keyboard shortcuts during boot, the menu can now be launched from within Windows—using either the PC Settings app, holding down Shift while clicking the Restart option in the Power menu, or by using the new "-o" switch on shutdown.exe. though the legacy version of the Advanced Startup menu can still be enabled instead.

UEFI firmware can be exposed to Windows via class drivers. Updated firmware capsules can be distributed as an update to this "driver" in a signed package with an INF file and security catalog, similarly to those for other devices. When the "driver" is installed, Windows prepares the update to be installed on the next boot, and Windows Boot Manager renders status information on the device's boot screen.

=== Video subsystem ===
Windows 8 includes WDDM 1.2 and DirectX Graphics Infrastructure (DXGI) 1.2. The Desktop Window Manager now runs at all times (even on systems with unsupported graphics cards; where DWM now also supports software rendering), and now also includes support for stereoscopic 3D content.

Other major features include preemptive multitasking with finer granularity (DMA buffer, primitive, triangle, pixel, or instruction-level), reduced memory footprint, improved resource sharing, and improved timeout detection and recovery. 16-bit color surface formats (565, 5551, 4444) are mandatory in Windows 8, and Direct3D 11 Video supports YUV 4:4:4/4:2:2/4:2:0/4:1:1 video formats with 8, 10, and 16-bit precision, as well as 4 and 8-bit palettized formats. Display-only and render-only WDDM drivers were also supported. Display-only WDDM drivers allow basic 2D-only video adapters and virtual displays to function while contents are rendered by existing renderers or a software rasterizer. Render-only WDDM drivers will render screen contents to specified display processors, commonly seen on laptops with dedicated GPUs. Otherwise, a full graphics WDDM driver will function as both of the display and rendering.

Windows 8.1 introduces WDDM 1.3 and adds support for Miracast, which enables wireless or wired delivery of compressed standard- or high-definition video to or from desktops, tablets, mobile phones, and other devices.

In Windows 8, the Microsoft Basic Display Adapter (MBDA) driver can supports WARP.

=== Printing ===
Windows 8 adds support for printer driver architecture version 4. This adds a Metro friendly interface as well as changes the way the architecture was written.

Windows 8.1 adds support for Wi-Fi Direct printing, NFC printing, and native APIs for 3D printing through the XML-based 3D Manufacturing Format (3MF).

=== Windows PowerShell ===
Windows PowerShell is Microsoft's task automation framework, consisting of a command-line shell and associated scripting language built on .NET Framework. PowerShell provides full access to COM and WMI, enabling administrators to perform administrative tasks on both local and remote Windows systems. Windows 8 includes Windows PowerShell v3.0. Windows 8.1 comes with Windows PowerShell v4.0 which features a host of new commands for managing the Start screen, Windows Defender, Windows components, hardware and network.

=== Windows To Go ===
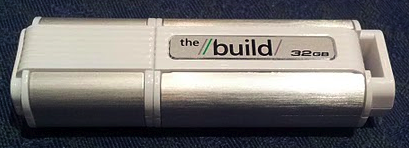
Bootable Windows To Go USB flash drive

Windows To Go is a feature exclusive to the Enterprise version of Windows 8 which allows an organization to provision bootable USB flash drives with a Windows installation on them, allowing users to access their managed environment on any compatible PC. Windows 8.1 updates this feature to enable booting from a USB composite device with a storage and a smart card function.

== Maintenance ==
The Action Center introduced in Windows 7 is expanded to include controls and notifications for new categories, including: device software, drive health, File History, HomeGroup status, Microsoft account status, SmartScreen, and Windows activation. Additionally, there is a new Automatic Maintenance feature, which can periodically perform a number of maintenance tasks, such as diagnostics, malware scans, and updates to improve system performance.

PC Settings app in Windows 8 can be used to interact with Windows Update, although the traditional interface from Control Panel is retained. Windows 8 is able to distribute firmware updates on compatible devices and can be configured not to automatically download Windows updates over metered networks. A new set of Windows PowerShell cmdlets enable adding or removing features of Windows, as Programs and Features applet in Control Panel does. The Deployment Image Servicing and Management (DISM) utility in Windows 8 includes all features that were previously available in ImageX and is able to periodically check for component store corruption and repair it. It can report the amount of disk space in use by WinSxS folder and can also determine if a cleanup should be performed.

Windows 8 can now detect when a system is experiencing issues that have been preventing the system from functioning correctly, and automatically launch the Advanced Startup menu to access diagnostic and repair functions.

For system recovery, Windows 8 introduced new functions known collectively as "Push-button reset", which allows a user to re-install Windows without needing to use installation media. The feature consists of "Reset" and "Refresh" functions, accessible from within the advanced boot options menu and PC Settings. Both of these options reboot the system into the Windows Recovery Environment to perform the requested operation; Refresh preserves user profiles, settings, and Windows Store apps, while Reset performs a clean installation of Windows. The reset function may also perform specialized disk wiping and formatting procedures for added security. Both operations will remove all installed desktop applications from the system. Users can also create a custom disk image for use with Refresh and Reset.

== Security ==
=== Address space layout randomization improvements ===
Address space layout randomization (ASLR) introduced in Windows Vista was improved in Windows 8 and has been updated in Windows 8.1 to allow randomization to be unique across devices.

=== Biometrics ===
Windows 8 introduces virtual smart card support. A digital certificate of a smart card can be stored onto a user's machine and protected by the Trusted Platform Module, thereby eliminating the need for the user to physically insert a smart card, though entering a PIN is still required. Virtual smart card support enables new two-factor authentication scenarios. Windows 8.1 improves this functionality by simplifying the device enrollment process for virtual smart cards and introduces additional virtual smart card functionality such as certificate attestation for Metro-style applications, and enrollment and management features via WinRT APIs.

Windows 8.1 features pervasive support for biometric authentication throughout the operating system, includes a native fingerprint registration feature, and enables the use of a fingerprint for tasks such as signing into a device, purchasing apps from the Windows Store, and consenting to authentication prompts (e.g., User Account Control). Windows 8.1 also introduces new WinRT APIs for biometrics.

=== Device encryption ===
On Windows RT, logging in with a Microsoft account automatically activates passive device encryption, a feature-limited version of BitLocker which seamlessly encrypts the contents of mobile devices to protect their contents. On Windows 8.1, device encryption is similarly available for x86-based Windows devices, automatically encrypting user data as soon as the operating system is configured. When a user signs in with a Microsoft account or on a supported Active Directory network, a recovery key is generated and saved directly to the user's account. Unlike BitLocker, device encryption on x86-based devices requires that the device meet the Connected Standby specifications (which among other requirements, requires that the device use solid-state storage and have RAM soldered directly to the motherboard) and have a Trusted Platform Module (TPM) 2.0 chip.

=== Device lockdown ===
Windows 8.1 introduces Assigned Access, formerly called Kiosk mode, which restricts the Windows device to a running a single predetermined Metro-style app.

Windows 8.1 was slated to include a Provable PC Health feature which would allow owners to subject devices connected to a network to remote PC analysis. Under Provable PC Health, connected devices would periodically send various configuration-related information to a cloud service, which would provide suggestions for remediation upon detection of an issue. However, the feature was dropped before the operating system's general availability.

=== Family Safety ===
Windows 8 integrates Windows Live Family Safety into the operating system, allowing parents to restrict user activity via web filtering, application restriction, and computer usage time limits. Certain parental controls functionality introduced in Windows Vista was made unavailable in Windows 7 in favor of Windows Live Family Safety. A notable change in Family Safety is that administrators can now specify time periods for computer usage. For example, an administrator can restrict a user account so that it can only remained signed in for a total time period of one hour. In previous versions of Windows, administrators could only restrict accounts based on the time of day.

=== Protected processes ===
Protected processes introduced in Windows Vista for digital rights management have been extended in Windows 8.1 to support additional scenarios along with a new Protected Process Light scheme. In Windows Vista, processes for digital rights management were either protected or unprotected. With the new scheme in Windows 8.1, processes can be assigned varying levels of protection, and core operating system components such as the Local Security Authority Subsystem Service can be protected by this scheme to prevent reading memory and code injection by non-protected processes.

=== Startup security ===
Windows 8 introduced four new features to offer security during the startup process: UEFI secure boot, Trusted Boot, Measured Boot and Early Launch Anti-Malware (ELAM).

Of the four, secure boot is not a native feature of Windows 8; it is part of UEFI. At startup, the UEFI firmware checks the validity of a digital signature present in the Windows Boot Loader (bootmgfw.efi), which is signed with Microsoft's public key. This signature check happens every time the computer is booted and prevents malware from infecting the system before the operating system loads. The UEFI firmware will only allow signatures from keys that has been enrolled into its database, and, prior to Windows 8 release, Microsoft announced that certified computers had to ship with the Microsoft's public key enrolled and with secure boot enabled by default. However, following the announcement, the company was accused by critics and free and open-source software advocates (including the Free Software Foundation) of trying to use the secure boot to hinder or outright prevent the installation of alternative operating systems such as Linux. Microsoft denied that the secure boot requirement was intended to serve as a form of lock-in, and clarified that x86 certified systems (but not ARM systems) must allow secure boot to enter custom mode or be disabled.

Trusted Boot is a feature of Windows boot loader and ensures the integrity of all Microsoft components loaded into memory, including ELAM, which loads last. ELAM ensures that all third-party boot drivers are trustworthy; they are not loaded if ELAM check fails. ELAM can use either Windows Defender or a third-party compatible antivirus. During the 2011 Build conference in Anaheim, California, Microsoft showed a Windows 8 machine that can prevent an infected USB flash memory from compromising the boot process.

Measured Boot can attest to the state of a client machine by sending details about its configuration to a remote machine. The feature relies on the attestation feature of the Trusted Platform Module and is designed to verify the boot integrity of the client.

==== Windows Platform Binary Table ====
Windows Platform Binary Table allows executable files to be stored within UEFI firmware for execution on startup. Microsoft states this feature is meant to "allow critical software to persist even when the operating system has changed or been reinstalled in a 'clean' configuration"; specifically, anti-theft security software; but this has also been mis-used, including by Lenovo with their "Lenovo Service Engine" feature.

=== Windows Defender ===
In Windows 7, Windows Defender was an anti-spyware solution. Windows 8 introduced Windows Defender as an antivirus solution (and as the successor of Microsoft Security Essentials), which provides protection against a broader range of malware. It was the first time that a standard Windows install included an antivirus solution. Windows 8.1 augments it with network behavior monitoring, a new feature for Windows Defender. For Microsoft Security Essentials, this feature has been present since July 2010.

== Keyboard shortcuts ==
Windows 8 includes various features that can be controlled through keyboard shortcuts.

- ⊞ Win+C Displays the Charms Bar.
- ⊞ Win+F Opens the Search charm to search for files.
- ⊞ Win+H Opens the Share charm.
- ⊞ Win+I Opens the Settings charm.
- ⊞ Win+J Switches between the active app and a snapped app.
- ⊞ Win+K Opens the Devices charm.
- ⊞ Win+O Locks the current display orientation.
- ⊞ Win+S Opens the Search charm to search for apps.
- ⊞ Win+Z Shows available app commands.
- ⊞ Win++ and ⊞ Win+- respectfully activate and deactivate semantic zoom.
- ⊞ Win+Space bar Switches the user's IME.
- ⊞ Win+Ctrl+Space bar Reverts to a previous IME.
- ⊞ Win+Tab ↹ Cycles through open Metro-style apps.
- ⊞ Win+Ctrl+Tab ↹ Cycles through open Metro-style apps and snaps them as they are cycled.
- ⊞ Win+⇧ Shift+Tab ↹ Cycles through open Metro-style apps in reverse order.
- ⊞ Win+PageUp In a multi-monitor configuration, moves the Start screen and open Metro-style apps to the display monitor on the left.
- ⊞ Win+PageDown In a multi-monitor configuration, moves the Start screen and open Metro-style apps to the display monitor on the right.
- ⊞ Win+, Initiates the Peek feature introduced in Windows 7.
- ⊞ Win+⇧ Shift+. Snaps an open Metro-style app to the left side of the screen.
- ⊞ Win+. Snaps an open Metro-style app to the right side of the screen.
- ⊞ Win+Print screen Takes a screenshot of the entire screen and saves it to a Screenshots folder within the Pictures directory. On a tablet, this feature can be accessed by simultaneously pressing a button with the Windows logo and a button that lowers the volume of the device.

== Virtualization ==
Hyper-V, a native hypervisor previously offered only in Windows Server, is included in Windows 8 Pro, replacing Windows Virtual PC, a hosted hypervisor.

== Storage ==
=== Storage Spaces ===
Storage Spaces is a storage virtualization technology which succeeds Logical Disk Manager and allows the organization of physical disks into logical volumes similar to Logical Volume Manager (Linux), RAID0, RAID1 or RAID5, but at a higher abstraction level. A storage space behaves like a physical disk to the user, with thin provisioning of available disk space. The spaces are organized within a storage pool, i.e. a collection of physical disks, that can span multiple disks of different sizes, performance or technology (USB, SATA, SAS). The process of adding new disks or replacing failed or older disks is fully automatic, but can be controlled with PowerShell commands. The same storage pool can host multiple storage spaces. Storage Spaces have built-in resiliency from disk failures, which is achieved by either disk mirroring or striping with parity across the physical disks. Each storage pool on the ReFS filesystem is limited to 4 PB (4096 TB), but there are no limits on the total number of storage pools or the number of storage spaces within a pool.

A review in Ars Technica concluded that "Storage Spaces in Windows 8 is a good foundation, but its current iteration is simply too flawed to recommend in most circumstances." Microsoft MVP Helge Klein also criticized Storage Spaces as unsuitable for its touted market of SOHO users.

Storage Spaces was further enhanced in Windows Server 2012 R2 with tiering and caching support, which can be used for caching to SSD; these new features were not added to Windows 8.1. Instead Windows 8.1 gained support for specific features of SSHD drives, e.g. for host-hinted LBA caching (TP_042v14_SATA31_Hybrid Information).

=== NVM Express ===
Windows 8.1 gained support for NVM Express (NVMe), a new industry standard protocol for PCIe-attached storage, such as PCIe flash cards.

Windows 8.1 also supports the TRIM command for PCI Express SSDs based on NVMe (Windows 7 supported TRIM only for AHCI/SATA) drives and only the ones which were connected internally via the M.2 or SATA/IDE connectors. Windows 8.1 supports the SCSI unmap command which is a full analog of the SATA TRIM command for devices that use the SCSI driver stack. If external SSD drives as well as the device firmware in the bridge chip both support TRIM, Windows 8.1 can perform a TRIM operation on these external SATA and NVMe SSDs that connect via USB as long as they use the USB Attached SCSI Protocol (UASP).

Windows 8.1 also introduces a manual TRIM function via Microsoft Drive Optimizer which can perform an on-demand user-requested TRIM operation on internal and external SSDs. Windows 7 only had automatic TRIM for internal SATA SSDs built into system operations such as Delete, Format, Diskpart etc.

However, Windows 8.1 built-in NVMe driver does not support NVMe passthrough protocol. Support for NVMe passthrough protocol was added in Windows 10.

== See also ==
- Windows Server 2012
- New features by Windows version:
  - XP
  - Vista
  - 7
  - 8
  - 10
  - 11
- Removed features by Windows version:
  - XP
  - Vista
  - 7
  - 8
  - 10
  - 11
