= Features new to Windows 10 =

Overview of the features introduced in Windows 10

Windows 10 introduced a number of new elements, including the option to use a touch-optimized interface (known as tablet mode) or a traditional desktop interface similar to that of Windows 7 along with live tiles from Windows 8. However, unlike previous versions of Windows, where most, if not all, major features for that release were completed by its RTM, Windows 10 continues to receive major features and changes beyond its initial release to market. Microsoft describes Windows 10 as an "operating system as a service" that will receive ongoing updates to its features and functionality. This is supplemented with the ability for enterprise environments to receive non-critical updates at a slower pace, and to use long-term support milestones that will only receive critical updates, such as security patches, over their ten-year lifespan of support.

== Version 1507 ==
Windows 10, codenamed "Threshold 1", is the first release of Windows 10. It carries the build number 10.0.10240. While the build itself doesn't contain the version number, Microsoft retroactively named this version 1507, standing for July 2015 and matching the versioning scheme for later updates. "Threshold 1" was announced on an event on September 30, 2014, with a first preview following the day after. The final release was made available to Windows Insiders on July 15, 2015, followed by a public release on July 29, 2015, as a free upgrade to Windows 7 and Windows 8.1.

The Threshold 1 release of Windows 10 is only supported for users of the Long Term Servicing Branch (LTSB).

New feature indicated for this release are only those added since Windows 8.1 Update 1, released in April 2014.

=== Bundled apps ===
The Mail app adds user-configurable swipe gesture controls and POP3 email support. Google Calendar support is added to the Calendar app. The Settings app is expanded to have similar functionality as the Control Panel, albeit with a Metro-style user interface. The Map app can download maps for offline use.

==== Microsoft Edge ====
Microsoft Edge is the new browser for Windows 10 and is the successor to Internet Explorer 11, although Internet Explorer will remain for compatibility and legacy purposes. Cortana has been integrated into Edge, accessible by the option "Ask Cortana" in the right click menu, as well as a Reading View and the ability to write notes directly on web pages and save to OneNote. A Reading List feature has also been added, where users can save articles or other content to be accessed and read later. Microsoft Edge also includes a Share button on its toolbar where tapping or clicking on it will bring up the system Share panel, where users will be able to share a webpage to installed applications such as Reading List or third-party apps such as Facebook and Twitter. Since its release, Microsoft Edge has scored 402 out of 555 points on HTML5test.

=== Development platform ===
Metro apps, renamed as Universal Windows Platform apps (UWP), features expanded capabilities. UWP emphasizes a core set of APIs common to all variations of the operating system, enabling the ability to code a single application with adaptations (such as user interface differences) for different device families and states, including desktops and laptops, tablets, smartphones (via Windows 10 Mobile), Xbox One, and other new device classes such as Surface Hub and HoloLens. An application may also react to the available displays and input on a device; when connected to a monitor or a suitable docking station, a UWP app on a smartphone can take on the appearance of the app on a PC. Information can also be synchronized between versions of an app for different devices, such as notifications and licensing.

=== Gaming ===
==== DirectX 12 ====
Windows 10 includes DirectX 12 alongside WDDM 2.0. Unveiled March 2014 at GDC, DirectX 12 aims to provide "console-level efficiency" with "closer to the metal" access to hardware resources, and reduced CPU and graphics driver overhead. Most of the performance improvements are achieved through low-level programming, which can reduce single-threaded CPU bottlenecking caused by abstraction through higher level APIs. The performance gains achieved by allowing developers direct access to GPU resources is similar to other low-level rendering initiatives such as AMD's Mantle, Apple's Metal API or the OpenGL successor, Vulkan. WDDM 2.0 introduces a new virtual memory management and allocation system to reduce workload on the kernel-mode driver.

==== Xbox One integration ====
Windows 10 brings more updates to the Xbox app introduced in Windows 8. Games from the Xbox One can be streamed to any Windows 10 device excluding smartphones.

==== Game Bar and Game DVR ====
Windows 10 introduces the Game Bar, which provides screenshot and video capture functionality for Windows games. When pressing ⊞ Win+G, users can invoke the Game Bar, record gameplay, or take a screenshot using the appropriate keyboard shortcuts. Windows 10 can also continuously capture gameplays in the background; this allows the user to request that the last few users defined moments of gameplay be saved to the hard disk. This is useful if a user wants to save and/or share a moment of gameplay but did not think to explicitly record it beforehand.

The Game Bar was later upgraded into a larger overlay, which now features "widgets" windows for functionality such as the user's Xbox friends list, audio settings, and system performance information.

=== Shell and user interface ===
Windows 10 also allows web apps and desktop software (using either Win32 or .NET Framework), to be packaged for distribution on Windows Store. Desktop software distributed through Windows Store is packaged using the App-V system to allow sandboxing. Web apps are executed from remote servers, and have access to Windows functions such as notifications and camera access. As with Windows 8, locally packaged web apps can be written using HTML and WinJS.

==== Action Center ====
What was once called "Action Center" in Windows 7, Windows Server 2008 R2 and their successor is now called Security and Maintenance. The title of "Action Center" in Windows 10 is usurped by a sidebar that provides a list of received notifications and a group of "Quick actions" buttons for different settings areas. It is accessed by clicking the Notifications icon in the system tray, or swiping from the right of the screen on touchscreens.

==== Command line ====
Windows 10 brings improvements to the system's command-line interface. Unlike in previous versions of Windows NT, the Win32 console windows can now be resized without any restrictions. It can be made to cover the full screen by pressing the Alt+↵ Enter combination on keyboard. Microsoft also enabled the use of standard keyboard shortcuts, such as those for cut, copy, and paste, within the console. Word wrapping and keyboard shortcuts to move the caret, select and manipulate text have become available. Other features such as word wrap and transparency were also included. The user has the option to disable the new features and return to the legacy console if they wish.

==== Continuum ====
Continuum is the blanket title for a group of features on Windows 10 that are designed to enable smoother transitions between a default interface mode designed for use with a keyboard and mouse, and an interface designed for touchscreen environments, especially on hybrid devices such as laplets. Enabling "Tablet mode" switches the primary interface to a full screen version of the Start menu, and opens all applications in a maximized view by default. The taskbar is also modified, adding a Back button next to the Start button, and by default, hiding buttons for opened and pinned applications. Task View is used as the primary means of switching programs. Windows can prompt to switch between these two modes, or automatically do so, if certain events occur, such as plugging in a keyboard or mouse to a tablet, switching a laplet to its laptop state, or vice versa.

==== Cortana ====
Windows 10 has brought the Cortana assistant from Windows Phone 8.1 to Windows 10. By default, Cortana appears as a search pane on the taskbar, but can be changed into a button, like in tablet mode, and can be activated by voice using the command "Hey Cortana", when a user searches the Start menu, or when a user searches the Cortana search pane. With Cortana, users can ask Cortana questions about the weather, calendar events, and other types of notifications, along with online information.Cortana currently requires a Microsoft Account to function. In August 2023 Cortana got discontinued by Microsoft to pivot to another AI assistant. That same AI assistant was released on Windows 10 in November 2023. The AI assistant is called Microsoft Copilot, a new and improved AI assistant that has newer features and updated information.

==== Start Menu ====
Windows 10 reintroduced the start menu as seen in versions of Windows prior to 8. However, unlike these versions, the new start menu includes live tile features from Windows 8. It is possible to resize the Start menu and view recently added and most used applications. It can also be made full screen for tablet users or users that prefer a Windows 8-like experience. The right hand side of the Start menu can be used to pin tiles. The menu can contain a limited amount of columns, depending on the screen resolution. These columns can be divided in groups that can all have their own title. Every group is divided into 6 or 8 other columns, depending on the user's settings, to allow either six or eight small sized tiles next to each other.

==== Task View ====
Task View is a task switching and virtual desktop system, accessible via the taskbar button, keyboard shortcut Windows+Tab ↹, or swiping from the left of a touchscreen. Activating Task View shows a zoomed display of all windows currently opened on a specific monitor; clicking on a window switches to it. Task View can also be displayed when a window is snapped to half the screen or three windows are snapped to fourths of the screen, prompting for a window to occupy the remainder of the screen. Task View also allows the creation of virtual workspaces; windows can be dragged into and out of these workspaces.

=== System Settings ===
The modern Settings app from Windows 8 continues to evolve in Windows 10, incorporating more system setting configuration functionality from the Windows Control Panel. The ultimate goal is to make the Settings app feature complete, obviating the need for the Control Panel.

The Push-button reset function has been changed to utilize files from the current Windows installation to rebuild the system rather than a separate recovery image. System updates carry over into the new installation and do not have to be re-downloaded. The separate "Refresh" option is removed; users are now given explicit choices within the Reset process to remove all personal files and applications, keep personal files but remove applications, or perform a full factory reset.

=== Security ===
MAC Address Randomization in Wi-Fi has been introduced to try to prevent third parties from using the MAC address to track devices.

== Windows Hello ==
Windows Hello is a feature on Windows 10 that allows users to unlock the device with a user's fingerprint, iris scan, or face. It is an alternate option for signing in. There are two ways to unlock the device.

=== Recognition ===
This feature uses IR camera to scan the user's face, similar to Apple's Face ID, users can unlock the computer with it. Although an external IR camera can be used, computer manufacturers sometimes integrate IR cameras into their products. Touch recognition allow users to touch a button on the computer.

== Version 1511 (November Update) ==
Windows 10 November Update, or Windows 10 Version 1511, codenamed "Threshold 2", is the first major update to Windows 10. It carries the build number 10.0.10586 and version 1511, referencing its date of release, November 2015. The first preview was released on August 18, 2015. The final release was made available to Windows Insiders on November 3, 2015, followed by a public release on November 12, 2015, to existing Windows 10 users, and as a free upgrade from Windows 7 and Windows 8.1. Unlike the initial release of Windows, this branch was also made available to existing Windows Phone 8.1-devices and the Xbox One and as a preview release to Windows Server 2016, and was pre-installed on new Windows 10 Mobile-devices like the Microsoft Lumia 950.

The Threshold 2 release of Windows 10 is supported for users of the Current Branch for Businesses (CBB)

The changes below highlight features new since the "Threshold 1" release of Windows 10.

=== Bundled Apps ===
- Windows Feedback app now allows sharing of feedback.
- Mail and Calendar apps now support dark and light theme, with various accent color option. External images can be set to automatically download, and Digital Signature, S/MIME Encryption are now supported
- Introduces Skype Messaging, Skype Video, and Skype Phone UWP apps.
- Update to the Xbox App
  - Find friends using Facebook
  - Record voice while recording gameplay using Windows 10's Game DVR feature
  - Browse the Xbox One and Windows 10 games store directly from the Xbox app
  - Compare game achievement progress with other Xbox Live users
  - Use the Xbox app for entering text on the Xbox One console
  - Updating activity feed and online friends list in real-time
- Other built-in apps have been refreshed with features and bug fixes

==== Microsoft Edge ====
- New features (e.g. pointer lock, Canvas blending modes, <meter> element, etc.) in Microsoft Edge
- Object RTC API now available in Microsoft Edge
- Tab previews on hover
- Added media casting in Microsoft Edge, excluding protected content
- Ask Cortana works inside PDFs in Microsoft Edge

=== Miscellaneous ===
- Compression of unused memory pages.
- New environment variable editor
- Enabled Nested Virtualization
- Windows Spotlight now enabled for the Pro edition. It was previously only available for the Home edition.
- Find my Device

=== Shell and user interface ===
==== Cortana ====
- Cortana is now available in Australia, Canada, India, and Japan.
- Users no longer need to sign into the PC with a Microsoft Account. They can simply log into Cortana separately.
- Users can make handwritten reminder in Cortana's notebook.
- Cortana can now send SMS through the desktop, or notify the user of missed calls.

==== Desktop ====
- Window snapping has been improved to allow auto resizing of the second snapped app when the first snapped app is resized. This only applies when two apps are snapped side-by-side (rather than when apps are snapped in the corners).
- More icons have been updated.

==== Start menu ====
- The Start menu can now be set to house four columns of medium-sized tiles per group. The default is still three columns, same as that of the initial version of Windows 10.
- The context menu for an app icon or tile includes Jumplist support. The context menu items themselves have been reorganized, with some bearing icons.
- Suggested Windows store apps now show up on start.

==== Tablet mode ====
- Windows 10's "snap assist" feature has been updated for tablet mode. Now, when two apps are snapped and a third app is launched, the user will be asked to select one of the currently two snapped apps with which to replace the newly launched.
- Improvements have also been made to "task view" in tablet mode to allow the user to drag open apps to the side of the screen to snap them or to the bottom of the screen to close them directly from task view.

=== System settings ===
- Added option to turn off the Windows background picture on the sign-in screen.
- Window title bar can now sport the user's chosen accent color. By default, the title bar is white, but with this update, enabling color for taskbar, start menu, and Action Center also enables the accent color on the title bar.
- Windows 10 can now be activated using Windows 7, 8, and 8.1 product keys.
- The last printer used is automatically set as default printer; this behavior can be turned off. Ability to set default printer by network location is removed.
- The settings app hosts a central location to manage connected accounts.
- Work Access enables devices to connect to Azure ID or enroll in a Mobile device management infrastructure.
- Time zones can be set automatically.
- Call History and Email added to privacy settings.
- Installed apps can be moved to a different storage device using the settings app. Furthermore, new apps can be set to automatically install on a selected storage device.

== Version 1607 (Anniversary Update) ==
Windows 10 Anniversary Update, or Windows 10 Version 1607, codenamed "Redstone 1", is the second major update to Windows 10 and the first of the 2 major updates that were given the "Redstone" codename. It was released on July 29, 2016.

=== Bundled apps ===
- Messaging Everywhere allows users to send SMS from their PC through their Windows 10 Mobile or Android phones
- New Skype Preview UWP app
- New Connect app which extends Continuum related capabilities
- "Feedback Hub" app merges previously separate apps, "Insider Hub" and "Windows Feedback". Users can now comment on feedback in the Feedback Hub
- More lightweight, scalable, and consistent UI, as well as underlying architecture improvements, and new features in maps app

=== Microsoft Edge ===
- Support for browser extensions, which can either be installed from the Windows Store or be sideloaded from external sources
- New history menu when right clicking the forward or backward buttons
- Improvements to favorites, downloads, and history
- Pinning tabs, so that they stay open
- Experimental VP9 support
- "Paste and go" and "Paste and search" options in the context menu
- Accessibility tree view, DOM API profiling, and extension debugging for F12 Developer Tools
- Default parameters, Async/await, Object.values, and Object.entries for JavaScript
- Drag and drop support for the upload feature
- Importing browser favorites from Mozilla Firefox
- Notifying about downloads in progress in the Action Center
- Support for changing the default location

=== Development platform ===
Universal Windows Platform apps can now support extensions, allowing for add-ons and DLCs for such apps and games, respectively. Furthermore, these add-ons can be managed from the Windows Settings app.

==== Windows Subsystem for Linux ====
The anniversary update for Windows 10 adds Windows Subsystem for Linux. This allows the Ubuntu user space to run natively on Windows. The subsystem translate Linux system call that Ubuntu uses to those of Windows NT kernel. This allows the Bash and other Ubuntu command line apps to run within the Windows console. There is, however, the interoperability restriction: Bash cannot run Windows apps and Windows cannot run Linux software.

==== Project Centennial ====
Project Centennial allows Win32 and .NET apps to be repackaged with APPX and allow them to use the full set of Windows Runtime APIs. This will also allow these apps be distributed through the Windows Store.

=== Action Center ===
- Icon is now on the far right corner, past the clock, and also has animation whenever a new notification appears
- Similar notifications will be grouped together, instead of all shown individually
- Quick Actions can now be added, removed, and rearranged
- Wi-Fi Quick Action now takes the user to the “Network” flyout instead of toggling On and Off status
- Action Center now notifies users about app updates and installations from the Windows Store
- Priority levels can now be set for app notifications in the Action Center

=== Desktop ===
- Controls in app previews on the taskbar have been redesigned
- Taskbar clock is now integrated with the Calendar app for showing events
- Clock now shows on all monitors in a multi-monitor setup
- Badges with number of notifications are now available for UWP apps pinned on the taskbar
- Taskbar settings moved to Settings app
- Volume flyout now allows users to switch between multiple audio output devices
- Virtual desktops can now be switched using touchpads by swiping four fingers to either side
- Windows can now be pinned to allow them to show up on all virtual desktops

=== Command line ===
- Improved scaling on high-DPI displays
- Better font selection
- Improved rendering for international characters
- Cursor rendering and hiding improvements
- Improved background color painting
- Improved scrolling for nano and EMACS editors

=== Cortana ===
- Cortana can now answer simple questions without signing into Cortana with a Microsoft Account
- Cortana in Spanish (Mexico), Portuguese (Brazil), and French (Canada)
- Music search button is now accessible from Cortana's main screen
- Cortana will now display reminders of commitments made via Email and of meetings that are urgent or outside of normally scheduled times
- Cortana will inform users on PC if their Cortana-enabled mobile device is low on battery
- Cortana for PC now supports Find My Phone, including the ability to ring the phone regardless of volume settings
- Cortana can share map directions from PC to a Cortana-enabled mobile device, and vice versa
- Cortana setup is now more simplified and automated
- Cortana now works on the lock screen with limited functionality such as setting reminders and searching
- Reminders can now be set using pictures or on content sent from contacts
- Search feature can now search for files in OneDrive
- Cortana's reminder is now a share target for any apps that use Windows share contract

=== Lock screen ===
- Email addresses are now hidden while device is locked
- Media controls show on top of lock screen

=== Start menu ===
- Most used apps list and All Apps list merged into a single view and elevated to top of Start UI
- Moved Power, Settings, and File Explorer to be always visible in the left rail of Start menu
- Recently added section now shows 3 entries by default instead of 1
- Any additional folders the user has chosen to appear on the Start menu will now be immediately available without the use of a hamburger menu

=== Tablet mode ===
- Full-screen All Apps list is brought back
- Added an option to only auto-hide the taskbar in Tablet Mode

=== Windows Ink Workspace ===
A new workspace environment for pen users. It includes virtual sticky notes on which a pen could be used to take notes. Sticky notes features optical character recognition (OCR) to highlight relevant text that can be used by Cortana. The workspace also includes a sketchpad, ability to take a screenshot and draw on it, and a virtual ruler.

=== System settings ===
- It is now possible to change the default title bar color (for applications not using a custom color) without altering the default color of Taskbar, Start menu, and Action Center.
- Universal dark mode has been added, allowing users to globally set whether UWP apps render in dark or light mode.
- Taskbar properties should now be set using the Settings app rather than its own properties dialogue box.
- All pages in the Settings app now have individual icons associated with them.
- Pen settings page now includes ability to adjust pen shortcuts, an option to ignore touch input when using the pen, and Windows Ink Workspace settings.
- Apps can now be reset if they become corrupted.
- Windows Insider Program settings has been given its own page.
- Battery usage and battery saver are now on a "Battery" page in Settings, with extended features for managing individual apps.
- Windows Update now has an "Active hours" setting that prevents automatic restarts during the set time. "Active hours" is a continuous period of time, with a maximum length of 12 hours.
- Users can test network speed directly from within the Settings app.
- Groups of temporary files can be selected for removal within Storage inside the Settings app.

=== Miscellaneous ===
- Kernel version numbers will now be consistent with Windows 10 Mobile
- Windows Defender can now scan offline
- Redesigned all emoji to be more consistent with the new design scheme
- Credential and User Account Control UIs aesthetically updated, as well as added the ability to sign in with Windows Hello, a PIN, or certificates
- The update progress experiences for updates and upgrades to new builds, are now similar
- The Blue Screen of Death now includes a QR code for easier troubleshooting
- Added one-handed kana touch keyboard for Japanese text typing
- Improved prediction capability, typing history management, cloud suggestions, and performance in Japanese IME
- Improved reliability of the Chinese IME
- Added support for NVMe HMB and NVMe streams

== Version 1703 (Creators Update) ==
Windows 10 Creators Update, or Windows 10 Version 1703, codenamed "Redstone 2", is a feature update to Windows 10 released on April 11, 2017. The first preview for this release was seeded out to Windows Insiders on August 11, 2016.

The Redstone 2 release of Windows 10 is currently in the development branch and available for Windows Insiders.

The changes below highlights features new since the Redstone 1 release.

=== Bundled apps ===
==== Microsoft Edge ====
- Ability to set a particular website as a reminder in Cortana by using the browser's "Snooze" feature.
- Improvements in handling pages with heavy use of text input that results in smoother performance in sites like TweetDeck
- Ability to Export favorites as HTML file and the ability to import favorites from HTML file.

=== Miscellaneous ===
- Structural improvements to OneCore
- Windows Delivery Optimizations can now seed OS and App updates by peer-to-peer means to reduce server bandwidth.
- Support create and display multi-partition on removable storage, such as USB flash drives.
- Pin input is possible with numeric keypad even when Num Lock is off.
- Support "software component" device class in Device Manager.
- Initial support for HDR.
- Allows "power overlay" slider.

=== Shell and user interface ===
- Tutorial banners are added to File Explorer
- Introductory Message in Action Center

=== System Settings ===
- Updated Wi-Fi settings page that unifies it across PCs and Mobile editions of Windows 10.
- "Windows Anywhere", a feature that enables users to synchronize Windows settings across their devices.

== Version 1709 (Fall Creators Update) ==
Windows 10 Fall Creators Update, or Windows 10 version 1709, codenamed "Redstone 3", is a feature update to Windows 10 released on October 17, 2017.

=== Individual application updates ===
==== Photos ====
Added Story Remix, a feature that allows you to organize slideshows that can consist of both pictures and videos. It is also possible to include audio within the slideshows.

=== Accessibility ===
==== Device learning mode ====
The narrator was updated with a device learning mode, which allows the user to send input from a keyboard, touch screen, or braille display, and get feedback on the functionality of that input, without actually doing the input first.

==== Braille improvements ====
Users who use the narrator have the ability to both type and read with different translations of braille. Braille users can also provide input for application shortcuts and modifier keys.

==== Image descriptions ====
Narrator was updated with functionality that would allow users to use artificial intelligence to generate descriptions for images that lack their own descriptions. The functionality also included support for optical character recognition, so it could extract text from images.

=== Windows Mixed Reality ===
==== Mixed Reality Viewer ====
The Mixed Reality Viewer allows users to import 3D models made using Paint 3D or obtained from the Remix 3D catalog. This feature allows users to use augmented reality to simulate placing 3D models into the real world.

=== Privacy improvements ===
==== Privacy statement ====
During the setup process, the user will be shown a privacy statement that explains the privacy consequences from the data Microsoft will collect, and how they process the information. The user will also be given a "Learn more" button, that will give you settings to disable certain telemetry features, such as location services, speech recognition, tailored experiences, and advertisements.

==== Application permissions ====
For newly installed applications after the installation of the Fall Creators Update, you will have to give applications permissions manually for cameras, microphones, contact lists, and calendars.

== Version 1803 (April 2018 Update) ==
Windows 10 April 2018 Update, or Windows 10 version 1803, is the fifth feature update to Windows 10.

- Timeline: A new feature to get a chronological view of the activities the user was previously doing and to switch back to those activities. Edge, File Explorer, Maps, and other built-in applications include support for Timeline. Any application written for Windows can interact with Timeline to give the system visibility into individual documents the user worked on inside that application.
- Windows Hello: Initial set up of Hello can be performed from the lock screen.
- Bluetooth: A new "Quick Pairing" capability that reduces the number of steps required to pair a nearby Bluetooth device. A toast notification is shown when a compatible device is near the computer and ready to be paired.
- Task Bar: The Acrylic visual style of the Fluent Design System is applied to the taskbar.
- OneDrive status icons are shown in File Explorer to show the synchronization status of files and folders.
- Game Bar: layout has changed to include a clock, and to provide new options to turn the microphone and camera on and off.
- Nearby Sharing: a new feature found in the Shared Experiences area of Settings that provides the ability to share files and web links to other Windows 10 machines over Wi-Fi or Bluetooth.
- My People: Acrylic visual style; three-contact limit is removed; new animations; drag-and-drop of contacts; app suggestions.
- Text prediction: A new optional feature to enable autocomplete and autocorrection in any Windows application. The on-screen keyboard also has support for multilingual text prediction, which shows suggestions based on the top three installed Latin languages.

=== Deployment ===
- Windows Autopilot: Windows Autopilot provides a modern device lifecycle management service powered by the cloud that delivers a zero touch experience for deploying Windows 10.
- Kiosk Browser
- Windows 10 Subscription Activation: Subscription Activation now supports Inherited Activation. Inherited Activation allows Windows 10 virtual machines to inherit activation state from their Windows 10 host.
- Windows Setup: Users can now run their own custom actions or scripts in parallel with Windows Setup. Setup will also migrate scripts to next feature release, so users only need to add them once.
- SetupDiag: SetupDiag is a new command-line tool that can help diagnose why a Windows 10 update failed.
- Windows Update for Business: Windows Update for Business now provides greater control over updates, with the ability to pause and uninstall problematic updates using Intune.
- Feature update improvements: Portions of the work done during the offline phases of a Windows update have been moved to the online phase. This has resulted in a significant reduction of offline time when installing updates.

=== Configuration ===
- Co-management: Intune and System Center Configuration Manager policies have been added to enable hybrid Azure AD-joined authentication. Mobile Device Management (MDM) has added over 150 new policies and settings in this release, including the MDMWinsOverGP policy, to enable easier transition to cloud-based management.
- OS uninstall period:The OS uninstall period is a length of time that users are given when they can optionally roll back a Windows 10 update. With this release, administrators can use Intune or DISM to customize the length of the OS uninstall period.
- Windows Hello for Business: Windows Hello now supports FIDO 2.0 authentication for Azure AD Joined Windows 10 devices and has enhanced support for shared devices, as described in the Kiosk configuration section.

=== Accessibility and Privacy ===
- Accessibility: Out of box" accessibility is enhanced with auto-generated picture descriptions.
- Privacy: The diagnostic data sent to Microsoft can now be deleted.

=== Security ===
- Security Baselines: The new security baseline for Windows 10 version 1803 has been published.
- Windows Defender Antivirus: Windows Defender Antivirus now shares detection status between M365 services and interoperates with Windows Defender ATP. Additional policies have also been implemented to enhance cloud-based protection, and new channels are available for emergency protection.
- Windows Defender Exploit Guard: Offers attack surface area reduction and extended support for Microsoft Office. Virtualization-based Security (VBS) and hypervisor-protected code integrity (HVCI) can now be enabled across the Windows 10 ecosystem. These Exploit Guard features can now be enabled through the Windows Defender Security Center.
- Windows Defender Advanced Threat Protection (ATP): Has been enhanced with many new capabilities.
- Windows Defender Application Guard: Added support for Microsoft Edge.
- Windows Defender Device Guard: Configurable code integrity is being rebranded as Windows Defender Application Control. This is to help distinguish it as a standalone feature to control execution of applications.
- Windows Information Protection: This release enables support for WIP with Files on Demand, allows file encryption while the file is open in another app, and improves performance.
- Office 365 Ransomware Detection: For Office 365 Home and Personal subscribers, Ransomware Detection notifies users when their OneDrive files have been attacked and guides the user through the process of restoring files.

=== Windows Analytics ===
- Upgrade Readiness: Upgrade Readiness has added the ability to assess Spectre and Meltdown protections on devices. It allows users to see if devices have Windows OS and firmware updates with Spectre and Meltdown mitigations installed, as well as whether the antivirus client is compatible with these updates.
- Update Compliance: Update Compliance has added Delivery Optimization to assess the bandwidth consumption of Windows Updates.
- Device Health: Device Health's new App Reliability reports enable users to see where app updates or configuration changes may be needed to reduce crashes. The Login Health reports reveal adoption, success rates, and errors for Windows Hello and for passwords—for a smooth migration to the password-less future.

=== Settings ===
- New visual layout of the homepage; introduction of a "house" icon to represent the link back to the home page; adoption of the Acrylic visual style.
- System -> Sound: New settings page in the System section to control audio input/output volume and devices, per-application audio levels, and access to the classic "Sound" control panel
- System -> Focus Assist: Previously called "Quiet hours"; provides new settings to control when notifications may be shown to the user, as well as specific people and apps that are allowed to show notifications when Focus Assist is enabled. There are also options to enable displaying a summary of missed notifications when Focus Assist is turned off.
- System -> Storage: New settings page called "Free up space now" which provides the same capabilities as Disk Cleanup. (Disk Cleanup is still included in 1803.)
- Devices -> Typing: New settings page called "Advanced keyboard settings" which provides the ability to choose a different input method than the installed language; new setting to enable or disable multilingual text prediction.

== Version 1809 (October 2018 Update) ==
Windows 10 October 2018 Update, or Windows 10 version 1809, is the sixth feature update to Windows 10.

- Snip & Sketch (aka Screen Sketch) is now an app for screenshot
- Notepad: Supports Unix-style (LF) and Macintosh-style (CR) end-of-line characters
- File Explorer: Incorporates a new unified light-on-dark color scheme
- OpenSSH as a Windows feature
- DirectX Raytracing

== Version 1903 (May 2019 Update) ==
Windows 10 May 2019 Update, or Windows 10 version 1903, is the seventh feature update to Windows 10.

- A new "Light" theme and a new desktop background
- Windows Sandbox, available in Windows 10 Pro, Education, and Enterprise, which allows users to run applications within a secured Hyper-V environment.
- The ability to "pause" updates has been added in Windows 10 Home.
- New search tool, separated from Cortana
- Brightness slider added in the notification center
- Kaomoji and symbols added to the emoji input menu
- Windows Mixed Reality can run Win32 applications within its environment
- Support for DirectML

== Version 2004 (May 2020 Update) ==
- Windows Subsystem for Linux 2
- DirectX 12 Ultimate
- Task manager improvements; in the form of: The ability to check temperatures of Graphics Processing Units(GPUs), and the added feature of listing disk type(e.g. HDD.)

== Version 21H2 (November 2021 Update) ==
- Support for DirectStorage, WPA3, NVMe 2.0
- Limited support for Alder Lake Thread Director

== Version 22H2 (October 2022 Update) ==
- Re-introduction of the search box on the taskbar
- The availability of Microsoft Copilot in Windows 10
- Richer weather experience on the lock screen
- Additional quick status (such as sports, traffic, and finance) on lock screen
- New Windows Spotlight desktop theme
- New account manager experience on the Start menu

== New keyboard shortcuts ==
Key combination	Function
⊞ Win+Ctrl+← and ⊞ Win+Ctrl+→	Switch between virtual desktops
⊞ Win+Ctrl+D	Create a new virtual desktop
⊞ Win+Ctrl+F4	Close this virtual desktop (unless it is the last desktop standing)
⊞ Win+Tab ↹	See all desktops and open apps via the Task View page
⊞ Win+Q	Invoke Cortana for voice input
⊞ Win+W	Open Windows whiteboard
⊞ Win+S	Invoke Cortana for typed input
⊞ Win+A	Invoke the Action Center
⊞ Win+X	Invoke Quick Links menu
⊞ Win+I	Invoke Settings app
⊞ Win+G	Open the Game Bar, a component of the Xbox Console Companion app
⊞ Win+.	Open the emoji selector

== See also ==
- New features by Windows version:
  - XP
  - Vista
  - 7
  - 8
  - 10
  - 11
- Removed features by Windows version:
  - XP
  - Vista
  - 7
  - 8
  - 10
  - 11
