= Poly (website) =

3D object library created by Google

- Screenshot of the Poly homepage on May 11, 2018.
- Website type: 3D object library
- Owner: Google
- Website: poly.google.com
- Commercial: No
- Registration: Optional (Google Account)
- Launched: November 1, 2017; 8 years ago
- Current status: Discontinued

Poly was a website created by Google for users to browse, distribute, and download 3D objects. It was launched in 2017 and intended to allow creators to easily share and access 3D objects. It featured a free library containing thousands of 3D objects for use in virtual reality and augmented reality applications.

In December 2020, Google announced Poly would be shut down on June 30, 2021.

== Features ==
Users could search the Poly model library by specific keywords and upload or download models in the OBJ file format. Most models could be "remixed" using Tilt Brush and Google Blocks application integration; the remixed object was automatically published on Poly with credit and links to the original creator. 3D objects could be viewed using Google Cardboard or Daydream View. Users could also create simple animated GIFs of the objects available for download.

=== API ===
On November 30, 2017, Google released the Poly API. It allowed developers to easily integrate 3D objects into their projects, and provided users access to the object library, while the app itself is running. The API also allowed uploading 3D objects directly to Poly with the Poly Upload API. The API could be used for web, Android, and iOS apps, while the Poly Toolkit was required for Unity and Unreal developers.

== See also ==
- WebGL
- Facebook 3D Posts
- Remix 3D
- TurboSquid
- Sketchfab
