= GrabCAD =

American software company

GrabCAD, Inc.
- Company type: Public
- Traded as: Nasdaq: SSYS
- Industry: Mechanical Engineering
- Founded: Cambridge, Massachusetts (2009)
- Founder: Hardi Meybaum (CEO / mechanical engineer)
- Headquarters: Cambridge, Massachusetts
- Key people: Jon Stevenson (VP of Technology)
- Products: See "Products and Solutions"
- Number of employees: 81 (2017)
- Website: grabcad.com

GrabCAD, Inc. is a Cambridge, Massachusetts-based startup that created a free cloud-based collaboration environment that helps engineering teams manage, view and share CAD files.

== History ==
GrabCAD was founded in Estonia in 2009 by current CEO, Hardi Meybaum, and Indrek Narusk as a marketplace to connect engineers with CAD-related jobs. GrabCAD evolved into a community for engineers to share CAD models and moved its HQ to Cambridge, MA in 2011. According to the company site, GrabCAD was founded with the goal of bringing together all the tools engineers need to manage and share CAD files into one platform.

On September 16, 2014, GrabCAD was acquired by Stratasys. Stratasys Ltd. is a manufacturer of 3D printers and 3D production systems for office-based rapid prototyping and direct digital manufacturing solutions.

== Products ==
=== Community ===
GrabCAD began as a Community where engineers could upload and download models from a free CAD library. As of March 2023, the Community consists of over 11,640,000 users and is over 5,570,000 open source models. The Community also offers a range of challenges with prizes, from Ultimaker's "3D Printer Toy Design Challenge" to GE's "Jet Engine Bracket Challenge", as well as pro bono challenges like ModVic's "Steampunk Wheelchair" and the "Eyes to Hear" Challenge.

=== Workbench ===
In April 2013, GrabCAD released Workbench, a free cloud-based collaboration solution that helps engineering teams manage, share, and view CAD files. Workbench is used by companies to support the design of physical products ranging from basic screws to jet engine brackets. The idea behind Workbench is to replace costly and complex solutions that engineering teams often use when versions and revisions become hard to track. Workbench allows multiple engineers to work on the same files at the same time without conflict. Workbench also lets engineers share files externally.

Workbench is hosted on Amazon's S3 secure server cloud architecture, and has a range of features including viewing of all major CAD file formats, file locking, local folder sync, model comparison, and management of bill of materials and revisions. Workbench users can view 3D models, as well as markup, explode, measure and pin comments, all directly in the browser.

=== Toolbox ===
Toolbox was released June 2013, which enables Workbench users to access third-party CAD applications that run on GrabCAD's platform. Currently there are four apps available from KeyShot, Autodesk, IronCAD and Solid Edge, but GrabCAD is focused on drawing in new CAD application developers to grow Toolbox's usefulness to engineers.

== See also ==
- SketchUp 3D Warehouse
- Sketchfab
- TurboSquid
