= Facebook 3D Posts =

Facebook 3D Posts was a feature on the social networking website Facebook. It was first enabled on October 11, 2017 by introducing a new native 3D media type in Facebook News Feed. Initially the users could only post 3D objects from Oculus Medium and marker drawings from Spaces directly to Facebook as fully interactive 3D objects. The feature was available for desktops and mobile phones that support the underlying WebGL API.

On February 20, 2018 Facebook added support for the industry-standard glTF 2.0 file format for Facebook 3D posts. This allowed artists and creators to share 3D content on Facebook from a variety of sources. To make 3D Posts glTF 2.0 compliant, the support for textures, lighting, and physically based rendering techniques was implemented. 3D posts also supported unlit workflows for photogrammetry and stylized art.

Facebook has since disallowed users from sharing 3D objects.

== Creating 3D Posts ==
There were four ways to get a 3D asset to appear in a Facebook Post:

- Drag and drop an asset into Facebook's Post composer and publish it.
- Share a link to a web page that has Facebook Open Graph Sharing metadata tags.
- Share a local asset on an Android device using Android's native Sharing action.
- Create a 3D Post programmatically with the 3D Posts API.

== Tools for authoring content ==
GLB files (binary form of glTF) were required to be loaded in Facebook 3D posts. These files could be obtained by converting from other files formats such as FBX or non-binary glTF. GLB files could also be directly exported from a variety of 3D editors, such as Blender, Vectary, Autodesk 3ds Max (using Verge3D exporter), Autodesk Maya, Modo, Microsoft Paint 3D, Substance Painter and others.
