= Microsoft 3D Viewer =

Retired 3D model viewing application by Microsoft

3D Viewer
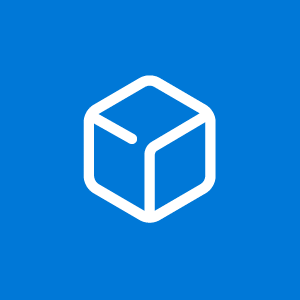

- Other names: Mixed Reality Viewer, View 3D
- Developer: Microsoft
- Release: 11 March 2016; 10 years ago
- Final release: February 2026 Update (7.2602.8012.0) / 11 February 2026; 9 months ago
- Operating system: Windows 10 Version 1709 to Windows 11 Version 26H1
- Platform: IA-32, x86-64, ARM32, ARM64
- Successor: Babylon.js
- Available in: 65 languages
- List of languages: Afrikaans; Albanian; Amharic; Arabic; Azerbaijani; Bangla (Bangladesh); Basque; Belarusian; Bulgarian; Catalan; Chinese (Simplified); Chinese (Traditional); Croatian; Czech; Danish; Dutch; English (United Kingdom); English (United States); Estonian; Filipino; Finnish; French; French (Canada); Galician; German; Greek; Hausa (Latin); Hebrew; Hindi; Hungarian; Icelandic; Indonesian; Italian; Japanese; Kannada; Kazakh; Khmer; Kiswahili; Korean; Lao; Latvian; Lithuanian; Macedonian; Malay; Malayalam; Norwegian (Nynorsk); Persian; Polish; Portuguese (Brazil); Portuguese (Portugal); Romanian; Russian; Serbian (Latin, Serbia); Slovak; Slovenian (Slovenia); Spanish (Latin America); Spanish (Spain); Swedish; Tamil; Telugu; Thai; Turkish; Ukrainian; Uzbek; Vietnamese
- Type: 3D modeling
- License: Proprietary, commercial software
- Website: apps.microsoft.com/detail/9nblggh42ths at the Wayback Machine (archived November 12, 2025)

3D Viewer (formerly Mixed Reality Viewer and before that, View 3D) is a retired 3D computer graphics viewer and augmented reality application that was first released in March 2016. It supports multiple file formats, including the .fbx, .3mf, .obj, and .stl.

The Mixed Reality Viewer was introduced in Windows 10 1703 and superseded by Babylon.js in 2026.

== History ==
On the first launch, 3D Viewer automatically renders an animated wasp on a grey background. Users can change the viewing angle, select and watch one of the available animations (defined in the 3D file) or adjust either of the 3 light sources. The light setup can be saved as "themes" and applied to other 3D objects quickly. The app also features four "Quick Animations".

These are ways in which the app can showcase the 3D object by changing the viewing angle. For example, the "Turntable" feature rotates the viewpoint around the object latitudinally. If the device running the app is equipped with a camera, the app can create a mixed reality experience that will allow you to tap on a surface you are viewing, and the 3D model will drop onto that surface. It will then make a rudimentary attempt at SLAM in order to keep the object in place.

View 3D was renamed to Mixed Reality Viewer on September 6, 2017, then to 3D Viewer on October 1, 2018.

On February 4, 2026, Microsoft announced that support for 3D Viewer would end on June 30, 2026. It was removed from the Microsoft Store on July 1, 2026, having been replaced by Babylon.js.

== Functions ==
Earlier versions of 3D Viewer supported uploading 3D models to Remix 3D, a Microsoft service that stopped accepting uploads in August 2019 and shut down in January 2020. It was also compatible with the now discontinued Paint 3D.

== Availability ==
3D Viewer is no longer included with the operating system as of Windows 11, although it could still be downloaded from the Microsoft Store through July 1, 2026.

== See also ==
- 3D Movie Maker
