= Remix 3D =

Microsoft website

- Website type: Online gallery
- Available in: English, Chinese, French, German, Italian, Portuguese, Russian, Spanish
- Owner: Microsoft
- Website: remix3d.com
- Registration: Optional (Microsoft account)
- Launched: October 26, 2016; 10 years ago
- Current status: Discontinued as of January 10, 2020

Remix 3D was a website created by Microsoft for users to browse, distribute, and download 3D objects. The website featured a free library containing thousands of 3D objects for use in virtual reality and augmented reality applications. Remix 3D was released first to Windows Insiders and then as part of the Windows 10 Fall Creators Update, alongside Paint 3D. The service also directly integrated with and/or supported 3D Viewer, as well as Paint 3D, SketchUp, Minecraft, and PowerPoint.

In July 2019, Microsoft announced that it would be shutting down the Remix3D site on 10 January 2020. According to ZDNet, two months prior to the announcement, Microsoft Corporate Vice President Kudo Tsunoda, the person in charge of Microsoft's 3D efforts, left his job. Users are encouraged to store their creations to their Outlook.com account, instead.

== See also ==
- Poly, a similar service by Google
- Facebook 3D Posts
- Sketchfab
