= Tilt Brush =

Virtual reality application

- Developer: Google
- Release: April 5, 2016
- Operating system: Microsoft Windows, PlayStation 4
- Website: www.tiltbrush.com
- Repository: github.com/googlevr/tilt-brush

Tilt Brush is a room-scale 3D-painting virtual-reality application available from Google, originally developed by Skillman & Hackett.

== Controls ==
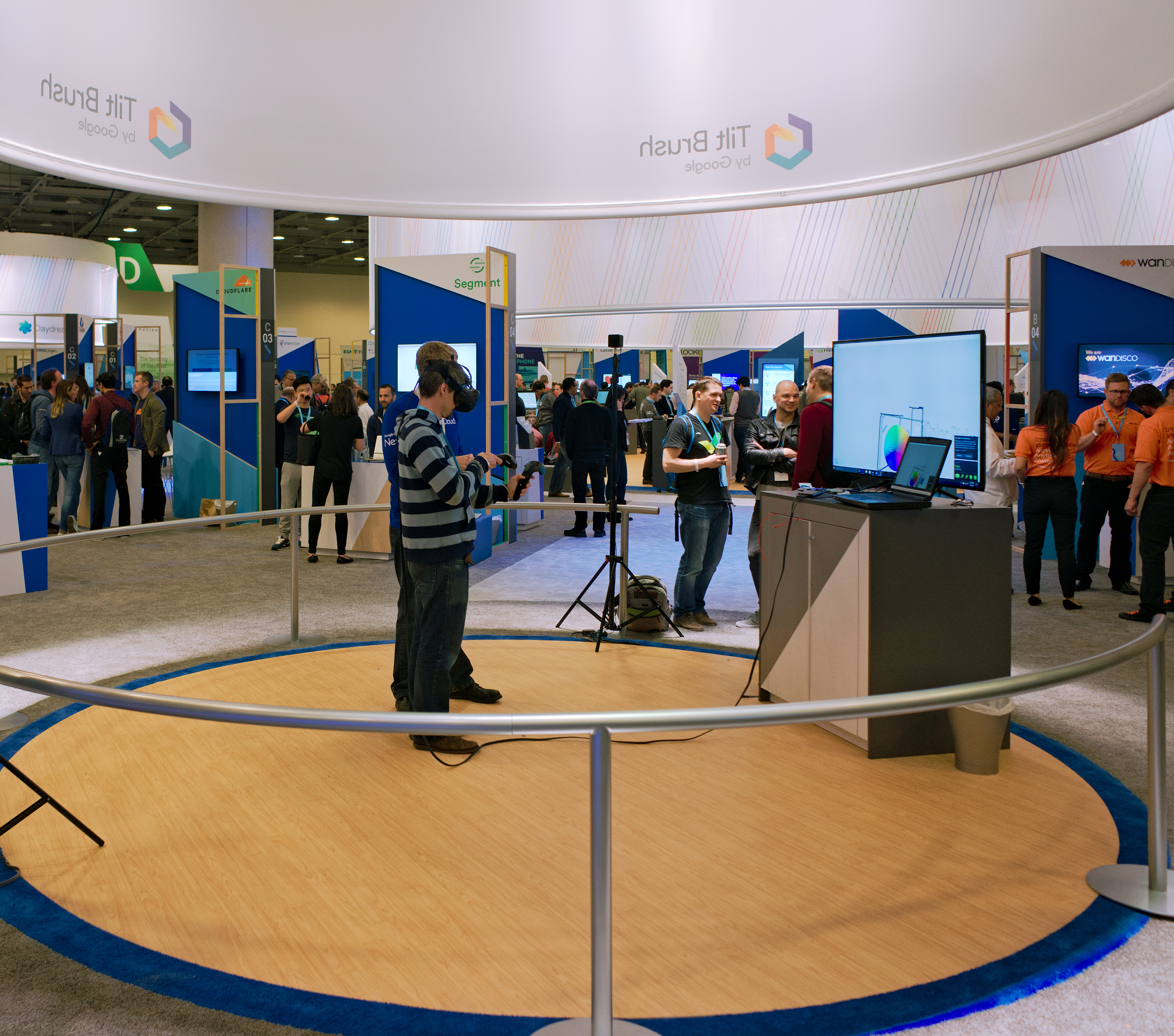
Demonstration of Tilt Brush at Google Cloud Next 2017

The application is designed for 6DoF motion interfaces in virtual reality. There is also a keyboard and mouse version, but this is not publicly available and is used only for development purposes. Users are presented with a virtual palette from which they can select a variety of brush types and colors. Movement of the handheld controller in 3D space creates brush strokes that follow in the virtual environment. Users can export their creations of room-scale VR pieces in .gltf, .fbx, .obj, .usd, .wrl, .stl and a native .json format. They can also capture snapshots, animated GIF images, .mpeg videos, or render 360 degree videos.

== Development ==
Tilt Brush was developed by Skillman & Hackett, and was in 2014 nominated for four Proto Awards (namely: "Best Interaction Design", "Most Innovative", "Best Overall Virtual Reality Application", and "Best GUI"), of which it won the "Best GUI" award. Google acquired Tilt Brush in 2015, as announced April 16, 2015. Tilt Brush was released for the HTC Vive at its launch on April 5, 2016, at no cost when pre-ordering the HTC Vive. On February 24, 2017, Tilt VR announced it is now available on both Oculus Rift and Vive.

In the Fast Company article about Tilt Brush, one of the creators said that the idea of drawing in 3D space came from a chess game prototype: “There was a happy accident. Tilt Brush came out of an experiment with a virtual reality chess prototype, where we accidentally started painting the chess pieces in the air, and it was incredible”. In the earlier versions of Tilt Brush, it was only possible to draw on two-dimensional planes.

On January 26, 2021, Google released the source code of the application under the Apache 2.0 license on GitHub.

== Development after Google ==
Since Google open-sourced the code multiple companies and individuals have contributed to its further development:

- A community-led project has continued development under the name "Open Brush" which remains free and open-source
- Rendever released a paid, multiuser version for the Oculus Quest which they called "Multibrush"
- The developer known as m₂ released a WebXR port called "Silk Brush"
- The augmented reality app Figmin has added large portions of Tilt Brush functionality

== Reception ==
Ars Technica and other sites referred to Tilt Brush as the HTC Vive's killer app, praising the program's intuitive interface and the excitement of painting in three dimensions. Edward Baig of USA Today said that the program was the only one that excited him in the platform's launch lineup. Chris Suellentrop of The New York Times wrote that the program was better suited for beginners than more engineering-oriented experiences like Fantastic Contraption. In 2018, Tilt Brush was employed for the first time in mixed reality news reporting by the NBC News studio NBC Left Field. During the 20th Annual D.I.C.E. Awards, the Academy of Interactive Arts & Sciences nominated Tilt Brush for "Immersive Reality Technical Achievement".

== Awards ==
- Best of Quest 2020: Top Creativity Tool
- Best of Quest 2019: VR Creativity Tool of the Year
- Webby Award 2018: Best of VR: Interactive, Game or Real-Time
- VR Awards 2017: VR Experience of the Year
- Cannes Lions 2017: 2 Gold Lions (Innovation, Digital Craft), 1 Silver
- Lumiere Award for Best VR Experience 2017
- Cinequest 2017 Best Interactive Experience
- CES 2017 Best of Innovations: Virtual Reality
- SXSW 2017 Interactive Innovation Award for VR/AR
- DICE 2017 Immersive Reality Technical Achievement Nominee
- The Vive Report Best HTC Vive Application 2016
- Co.Design Innovation by Design Awards 2016: Best App
- Ciclope 2016: Best Virtual Reality - Real Time Rendered
- Tech Crunch #2 top VR experience 2016
- UploadVR 2016 Game of the Year Awards: Best Creativity App Winner
- Android Central 2016: Best VR App
- Animation Magazine Best Tech of 2016
- Proto Awards 2016: Best Overall, Most Innovative
- Unity Awards 2016: Best Non-game Project
- Unity Awards 2015: Best VR Experience
- Proto Awards 2014: Best GUI

== See also ==
- Poly (website)
