= Action Center =

Microsoft Windows application

- Action Center on Windows 10
- Developer: Microsoft
- Operating system: Windows 10
- Successor: Quick Settings and Notification Center (Windows 11)
- Type: Action Center

Action Center is a notification center included with Windows Phone 8.1, Windows 10 and Windows 10 Mobile. It was introduced with Windows Phone 8.1 in July 2014, and was introduced to the desktop with the launch of Windows 10 on July 29, 2015.

The Action Center replaces the charms in Windows 10.

The Action Center was replaced with Quick Settings and the Notification Center in Windows 11.

== Features ==
Action Center allows for four quick settings, and in Windows 10 users can expand the view to show all of the quick settings. Notifications are sorted into categories by app, and users can swipe right to clear notifications. Action Center also supports actionable notifications starting with Windows 10. In the mobile version, the user can swipe from the top to the bottom to invoke Action Center, and further features introduced in Windows Phone 8.1 include the ability to change simple settings such as volume controls. The new notifications area's design allows the user to for example change wireless networks, turn Bluetooth and Airplane Mode on or off, and access "Driving Mode" from four customisable boxes at the top of the screen, while beneath these four horizontally placed boxes include recent text messages and social integration. On the desktop version, the user can invoke Action Center by clicking on its icon on the taskbar (at the lower right corner of the screen), or by swiping from the right.

Microsoft announced at Microsoft Build 2016 that Cortana would be able to mirror notifications between the Actions Centers of Windows 10 Mobile and Windows 10, and Cortana would also be able to synchronize notifications from Android devices to the Windows 10 Action Center.

== See also ==
- Notification Center (iOS and macOS)
- Notification service
