= TurboSquid =

American digital media company

TurboSquid, Inc.
- Type: Subsidiary
- Industry: Computer animated Film
- Founded: New Orleans, Louisiana (2000; 26 years ago)
- Founder: Matt Wisdom; Andy Wisdom; David Avgikos; Tom Avgikos
- Headquarters: New Orleans, Louisiana
- Area served: Worldwide
- Key people: Matt Wisdom (CEO); Chris Phillips (COO); Mark Kurt (CTO); Eric Arvidson (CFO)
- Products: Stock 3D Models
- Services: Stock 3D Models
- Number of employees: ~100(September 2013)
- Parent: Shutterstock
- Website: turbosquid.com

TurboSquid is an American digital media company that sells stock 3D models used in 3D graphics to a variety of industries, including computer games, architecture, and interactive training. The company, headquartered in New Orleans, Louisiana in the United States, is most known for brokering the sale of 3D models in return for a percentage of the sales. As of 2025, TurboSquid has over 1.4 million 3D models in its library. Turbosquid also has over 130,000 other products available, such as texture maps.

== History ==
TurboSquid was founded by Matt Wisdom and Andy Wisdom, who were partners in Chimera Digital Imaging, a company that produced 3D animation for television commercials from 1994 to 2000. During that time the pair began researching ways to sell or license unused 3D models. They officially began software development of a marketplace in 1999 under the brand iPublish.

At the same time Digimation, a New Orleans company founded by David Avgikos, was working on a similar project called 3dBay. In April 2000, the two groups officially merged to form TurboSquid. Backed by angel funding, the company announced the new marketplace at the SIGGRAPH conference in August 2000. Autodesk subsequently distributed 3ds max 4 with a TurboSquid add-on, and TurboSquid received its first venture investment in April 2001.

Disagreement over many aspects of the company led to the departure of Tom Avgikos, and initial CEO David Avgikos, and a complete separation from Digimation in 2002. Andy Wisdom served as the CEO for the next several years.

In 2005, Matt Wisdom and Andy Wisdom initiated and were instrumental in drafting and passing the Louisiana Digital Media Act (Louisiana Senate Bill 341), which seeks to stimulate growth in the technology sector by providing tax credits to digital media companies. Also in 2005, levee failures in New Orleans following Hurricane Katrina caused catastrophic flooding and prompted the evacuation of nearly 500,000 city residents, including all of TurboSquid's New Orleans staff. Because the company's business is run on servers outside New Orleans, and employees were able to continue work over the Internet, the site's business was able to maintain record growth through the whole period of displacement. Rather than relocate, the company decided to return to New Orleans, which it did in November 2005.

In 2006, Matt Wisdom became the company CEO. Andy Wisdom moved on to Chairman of TurboSquid's board and began working in the finance industry.

In August 2009, TurboSquid implemented the SquidGuild, a loyalty program that pays higher royalties to artists who post their 3D models exclusively at TurboSquid. In 2011, the registered membership has crossed the 2.3 million mark, and the number of contributing artists has passed 20,000. In that same year, Autodesk bought marketplace software from Turbosquid for $26M.

In 2021, TurboSquid was acquired by Shutterstock for $75M.

== Company name ==
Regarding the company's name, Matt Wisdom said: "Having a good brand is a really important part of having a business. The idea of a squid was something we could brand around; a squid conjures the idea of having tentacles everywhere. And 'turbo' - well, everything that was big in the '80s was 'turbo.' Not surprisingly, the domain name TurboSquid.com was available. When I asked five different people about the name, three of them liked it a lot, one of them hated it, but came around, and one hated it, but remembered it. That's the sign of a good brand. And it was more passionate than Media-Exchange.com."

== CheckMate 3D modeling standards ==
In August 2011 TurboSquid introduced the CheckMate Certification program, where models are checked against a unified 3D modeling standard developed by TurboSquid, and passing models are marked as certified in their catalog. By December 2011 more than 2500 models at TurboSquid had been CheckMate certified, with over 100 artists participating.

== Acquisitions ==
- In March 2011 TurboSquid acquired Falling Pixel and Exchange 3D. Jonathan Lloyd, former managing director of Falling Pixel, was brought on as a member of the TurboSquid executive team.
- TurboSquid announced the acquisition of CGStudio and TF3DM in January 2017.
- TurboSquid announced acquisition by Shutterstock in January 2021.

== See also ==
- SketchUp
- 3D Warehouse
- Sketchfab
- GrabCAD
- Ai CAD libraries
