= Paint 3D =

Retired 3D Graphics software developed by Microsoft

- Logo

- Paint 3D on Windows 11
- Developers: Microsoft; (Lift London)
- Release: 5 April 2017, 9 years ago
- Final release: 6.2410.13017.0 / 4 November 2024; 2 years ago
- Operating system: Windows 10 Version 1703 to Windows 11 Version 24H2
- Successor: Microsoft Paint, Microsoft Photos or Microsoft 3D Viewer
- Available in: 65 languages
- List of languages: Afrikaans; Albanian; Amharic; Arabic; Azerbaijani; Bangla (Bangladesh); Basque; Belarusian; Bulgarian; Catalan; Chinese (Simplified); Chinese (Traditional); Croatian; Czech; Danish; Dutch; English (United Kingdom); English (United States); Estonian; Filipino; Finnish; French (France); French (Canada); German; Greek; Hausa (Latin); Hebrew; Hindi; Hungarian; Icelandic; Indonesian; Italian; Japanese; Kannada; Kazakh; Khmer; Kiswahili; Korean; Lao; Latvian; Lithuanian; Macedonian; Malay; Malayalam; Norwegian (Nynorsk); Persian; Polish; Portuguese (Brazil); Portuguese (Portugal); Romanian; Russian; Serbian (Latin, Serbia); Slovak; Slovenian; Spanish (Latin America); Spanish (Spain); Swedish; Tamil; Telugu; Thai; Turkish; Ukrainian; Uzbek; Vietnamese
- Type: Raster graphics editor, 3D modeling
- License: Proprietary
- Website: apps.microsoft.com/detail/9nblggh5fv99 at the Wayback Machine (archived October 4, 2023)

Paint 3D, also known as Microsoft Paint 3D, is a retired raster graphics and 3D computer graphics software program application which was developed as a refresh of Microsoft Paint app. It is one of several 3D modeling and printing applications (formatted under 3MF) introduced or improved with the Windows 10 Creators Update, including 3D Viewer, Windows Mixed Reality, and Holograms, along with the CAD programs 3D Builder and 2D Builder.

Developed by Microsoft's Lift London studio, Paint 3D incorporates features of the Microsoft Paint and 3D Builder applications to combine a lightweight hybrid 2D-3D editing experience that allows users to pull in a variety of shapes from the app, their personal computer, and Microsoft's OneDrive service.

== History ==
Screenshot of Paint 3D showing off 2D and 3D features

In May 2016 a leaked Universal Windows Platform version of Microsoft Paint was revealed with a new hybrid ribbon-sidebar interface and some support for 3D objects. Microsoft rolled out a dummy app called Newcastle through the Windows Store to replace installation of the leaked build.

In October 2016, a user on X (formerly Twitter) leaked out official tutorial videos of an upcoming version of Paint for Windows 10. The video showcases new features such as a completely redone interface with pen input in mind, as well as the ability to create and modify basic 3D models.

The Universal Windows Platform version was officially announced and released during a Surface event on October 26, 2016 as part of the Keynote presentation on the Windows 10 Creators Update. The app was made available for Windows 10 users with a build number of 14800 or higher and coexists with the previous version of Paint as of build 14955. Microsoft revealed a community website for sharing Paint drawings, with a focus on the new 3D formats. In addition to the 3D format, this update brought features like transparent pixels in 2D drawings, clip art stickers, and background removal. It also revamped the app's look with new icons and a blue-purple theme, and offered ways to share and import creations.

Paint 3D was briefly made a replacement to Microsoft Paint, in Windows builds 14971 and 14986. However, due to complaints about the new interface and features missing in Paint 3D, the Windows team decided to allow the two apps to coexist.

Windows Insider chief Dona Sarkar confirmed that a Windows 10 Mobile version of Paint 3D had entered the alpha stage of development. In the Windows 10 Fall Creators Update, an updated version of Paint 3D was released in the Windows Store. It allowed users to directly Upload or Download models from Remix 3D.

Paint 3D's most heavily promoted features were related to its support for 3D objects. It included many of the 2D objects from Microsoft Paint and new colorful 2D "stickers", which were functionally similar to traditional 2D shapes, and patterns that could be applied to the background and 3D objects. 2D text was available, as well as 3D text.

Animations could be saved in 2D and 3D formats and shared using the Windows Share feature or OneDrive (purposed as a user-generated warehouse, replacing remix3d.com). Because of these features, Microsoft included a license agreement that appeared when the app was launched.

The user was greeted with a welcome screen with tutorials, information about Paint 3D, and options for opening or starting a project. The screen could be disabled and reenabled. Like its predecessor, Paint 3D supported multiwindowing. Both supported jumplists, but only Paint 3D displayed 3D objects in its jumplist (other picture types were permissible).

On August 12, 2024, Microsoft announced that Paint 3D would be removed from the Microsoft Store on November 4, 2024, being replaced by the original Paint, Photos and 3D Viewer.

== Reception ==
Paint 3D was praised for the new features it introduced, its role in Windows 10's evolving 3D support, the new user interface, improved stylus support, and a level of innovation not seen in the development of Microsoft Paint.

However, users criticized it on the Internet and in the Feedback Hub for lacking some of the features of Microsoft Paint, lacking 3D tools, and not being as ergonomically intuitive with a mouse and keyboard, particularly in its earliest iterations.

== See also ==
- Tilt Brush
- ArtRage
- Unity (game engine)
