= Settings (Windows) =

Configuration interface of Windows 8 or later

Windows Settings

- Screenshot of Windows 11's Settings app
- Developer: Microsoft
- Included with: Windows 8 and later Windows Server 2012 and later
- Type: Control panel
- Website: learn.microsoft.com/en-us/windows/uwp/launch-resume/launch-settings-app

Windows Settings (formerly PC settings), or simply Settings app, is a component of Microsoft Windows. It allows users to adjust their user preferences, configure their operating system, and manage their connected devices. Microsoft introduced Settings with Windows Server 2012 and Windows 8, and initially intended it to replace the Windows Control Panel, something that has not happened after more than a decade/14 years.

== Overview ==
The Settings app initially exposed a very small portion of Windows Control Panel (Powershell)'s functionality. Over time, however, it has become the sole user interface and control point for functions such as Windows Update (removed from Control Panel) and Windows Hello Control Panel Edition (never added to Control Panel). The app categorizes its settings by function, just as the Control Panel did since Windows XP. Unlike the Control Panel, however, it does not offer a unified mode in which the bulk of all available settings assail the app window in a contextually haphazard fashion.

The Windows Settings app is a UWP app, installed in the C:\Windows\ImmersiveControlPanel path. The Windows components in charge of servicing UWP apps also work with this app, but refer to it as Windows.ImmersiveControlPanel.

== History ==
The first versions of Windows to make the Settings app available were Windows Server 2012 and Windows 8, which Microsoft released to manufacturing on 1 August 2012. Before that, Windows users had to use Control Panel to configure their operating system. Microsoft has alleged that Settings would eventually replace Control Panel, but as of June 2026, it has not happened.

=== First generation of Settings app on Windows ===
Screenshot of Windows 8's Settings app

Screenshot of Windows 8.1's Settings app

The first generation of the app, called "PC Settings", was included with Windows 8, Windows Server 2012, Windows 8.1, and Windows Server 2012 R2.

On Windows 8, the PC Settings app was designed as a simplified area optimized for use on touchscreen devices. It exposes a small portion of Control Panel functionality on a two-paned full-screen interface. Adding accounts and changing user pictures could only be done from this app. Windows 8.1 improved upon this component to include more options that were previously exclusive to Control Panel, as well as providing more organization and a redesign. It also added a small "Control Panel" link at the bottom of the left pane to allow users to open the Control Panel and access further options.

The categories listed are:

- PC and devices
- Accounts
- OneDrive
- Search and apps
- Privacy
- Network
- Time and language
- Ease of Access
- Update and recovery

=== Second generation of Windows Settings app ===
Screenshot of Windows 10's Settings app, in RTM–v1511

Screenshot of Windows 10's Settings app, in v1607–1709

Screenshot of Windows 10's Settings app, in v1803–22H2. The same design is also used in Education, Pro for Workstations and Enterprise editions, albeit the top recommendations bar is removed and replaced with the "Windows Settings" text instead, just like the 2nd redesign.

The second generation of the app, called "Settings", has been included with all releases of Windows 10 (including Windows 10 Mobile edition), as well as Windows Server 2016, 2019 and 2022. It includes more options that were previously exclusive to the desktop Control Panel. Windows Update, which belonged to the Control Panel prior to Windows 10, now exclusively belong to Settings. The latest version contains the following categories:

- System
- Devices
- Phone (introduced in v1709)
- Network & Internet
- Personalization
- Apps (introduced in v1703)
- Accounts
- Time & Language
- Gaming (introduced in v1607)
- Ease of Access
- Search
- Cortana (introduced in v1703; removed in version v2004)
- Privacy
- Update & Security
- Mixed Reality (introduced in v1703; appears only if a device meeting minimum HoloLens requirements is connected to the PC)

While most of these categories offer what their name says, the "Update & Security" category contains an amalgam of loosely related items, including: Update, delivery optimization, backup, troubleshooting, recovery, activation, finding lost devices, the developer mode, and the Windows Insider program. Unlike what its name says, it cannot alter any security-related feature of the operating system.

Windows Server 2022 updates some of the visual elements of the app, but not as extensively as Windows 11's version and Windows Server 2025's version.

=== Third generation ===
On Windows 11 and Windows Server 2025, the app has undergone a significant visual redesign, with a new layout, greater translucency, and refreshed icons, following the Fluent Design System. A persistent navigation sidebar has also been added, linking to various groupings of settings within the app.

The Windows 11 Settings app contains the following categories:

- Home (added in Windows 11 22H2 and 23H2)
- System
- Bluetooth & devices
- Network & internet
- Personalization
- Apps
- Accounts
- Time & language
- Gaming
- Accessibility
- Privacy & security
- Windows Update
