= List of features removed in Windows Phone =

While Windows Phone contains many new features, a number of capabilities and certain programs that were a part of previous versions up to Windows Mobile 6.5 were removed or changed. Until Windows Mobile 6.5, the previous version did always cover the complete feature range of the predecessor version.

The following is a list of features which were present in Windows Mobile 6.5 but were removed in Windows Phone 7.0.

== Calling ==
- The list of past phone calls is now a single list, and cannot be separated into inbound, outbound or missed calls

== Sync ==
- Windows Phone does not support USB sync with Microsoft Outlook's Calendar, Contacts, Tasks and Notes as opposed to older versions of Windows Mobile with Desktop ActiveSync. Syncing Contacts and Appointments is done via cloud-based services (Windows Live, Google, or Exchange Server), and no method to sync this information directly with a PC is provided. Third-party software, such as Akruto Sync, provides some of this functionality. A petition to Microsoft was filed to reinstate USB sync for Outlook.

== Other ==
- Adobe Flash
- Ability to open .exe files (desktop Windows executeables), such as 7-Zip 32-bit for desktop.

== Features subsequently implemented in Windows Phone 7.5 ==
- Internet sockets
- Cut, copy, and paste
- Partial multitasking for 3rd party apps
- Connecting to Wi-Fi (wireless) access points with hidden SSID, but without WPA
- Tethering to a computer
- Custom ringtones
- Universal email inbox
- USSD messages
- VoIP calling through a separate app

== Features subsequently implemented in Windows Phone 8.0 ==
- Removable SD cards
- USB mass-storage
- Bluetooth file transfers
- Connecting to Wi-Fi (wireless) access points with both a hidden SSID and WPA protection
- Sideloading for corporate apps
- VoIP and IP Videocalling integrated in the Phone app
- Support for Office documents with security permissions (Note: Windows Phone 7 does not support Office documents with security permissions)
- On-device encryption
- Strong passwords
- Full Exchange support (Note: While the older Windows Mobile phones supported the full range of Microsoft Exchange Server policies, Windows Phone 7 only supports a small subset of Exchange features.)
- Native applications
- Full background multitasking

== Features subsequently implemented in Windows Phone 8.1 ==
- IPsec security (VPN)
- System-wide file manager
- The 'Weekly' view in the Calendar app
- Universal search
- UMTS/LTE Videocalling

== See also ==
- List of features removed in Windows XP
- List of features removed in Windows Vista
- List of features removed in Windows 7
- List of features removed in Windows 8
- List of features removed in Windows 10
