= Features new to Windows 11 =

Overview of the features introduced in Windows 11

Windows 11 is the current major release of Microsoft's Windows NT operating system. Released on October 5, 2021, Windows 11 succeeds the previous major release, Windows 10.

Major updates introduced with the product include a redesigned user interface, new productivity and collaboration features, and updates to security and accessibility.

As a current release, the operating system receives annual feature enhancements, such as the addition of artificial intelligence features like Microsoft Copilot which launched in 2023.

== Windows Shell ==
- Fluent Design System: Updates the Fluent Design System, a design language introduced by Microsoft in 2017, are featured in Windows 11. According to Microsoft, the design of Windows 11 is "effortless, calm, personal, familiar, complete, and coherent." The redesign focuses on simplicity, ease of use, and flexibility, addressing some of the deficiencies of Windows 10. Most interfaces in Windows 11 feature rounded geometry, refreshed iconography, new typography, and a refreshed color palette. In addition, translucency and shadows are made more prevalent throughout the system. Windows 11 also introduces "Mica", a new opaque Material that is tinted with the color of the desktop wallpaper.
- Start Menu: The Start menu has been significantly redesigned in Windows 11, adhering to the principles of the updated Fluent Design System. The menu has now been moved to the center by default, with an option to move it back to the left side. The Live Tiles feature introduced in Windows 8 is replaced by a set of pinned apps and a new cloud-powered "Recommended" section that shows recently opened files and documents from any location, including a PC, a smartphone, and OneDrive. The new Start menu also includes a search box.
- Taskbar: The Taskbar has also been center-aligned, and now includes new animations for pinning, rearranging, minimizing, and switching apps on the Taskbar. The buttons can still be moved to the left-hand corner as in previous versions of Windows.
- Notification Center & Quick Settings: The Action Center from Windows 10 has been replaced by a Notification Center and a Quick Settings menu, both accessible from the lower-right corner of the Taskbar. The Notification Center contains all the user's notifications and a full-month calendar, while the Quick Settings menu lets the user manage common PC settings quickly and easily like Volume, Brightness, Wi-Fi, Bluetooth, and Focus Assist. Directly above the Quick Settings menu, the user can see media playback information when watching a video on platforms such as YouTube, or when listening to music in apps like Spotify.
- File Explorer: The File Explorer on Windows 11 has been refreshed with the Fluent Design System and the Ribbon interface has been replaced with a new command bar with a revamped user interface and a Mica background. It also introduces revamped context menus with rounded corners, larger text, and Acrylic. App developers will also be able to extend the new context menus.
- Themes: In addition to new default themes on Windows 11 for both Light and Dark mode, it also includes four new additional themes. Windows 11 also adds new high-contrast themes for people with visual impairments.
- Sounds: Windows 11 introduces a new set of system sounds. The sounds are slightly different depending on whether the theme is set to light or dark mode. In addition, a new Windows startup sound replaces the one used since Windows Vista.
- Widgets: Windows 11 adds a new taskbar flyout named "Widgets", which displays a panel with Microsoft Start, a news aggregator with personalized stories and content (expanding upon the "news and interests" panel introduced in later builds of Windows 10). The user can customize the panel by adding or removing widgets, rearranging, resizing, and personalizing the content.

== User interface (UI) improvements ==
- Windows 11 updates several system dialog boxes such as the alert for when the battery is running low.
- The taskbar previews have been updated to reflect Windows 11's new visual design.
- The hidden icons flyout on the lower-right corner of the taskbar has also been redesigned to match Windows 11's visuals.

== Multitasking ==
- Snap Layouts: Users can now hover over a window's maximize button to view available snap layouts, and then click a zone to snap the window. They will then be guided to snap windows to the rest of the zones within the layout using a guided snap assist. There is a set of four available snap layouts on smaller screens.
- Snap Groups: Snap groups are a way to easily switch back to a set of snapped windows, which are stored in the grouped app's taskbar icons.
- Virtual Desktops: Users can now reorder and customize the background for each of their desktops. They can also hover over the Task View button on the Taskbar to quickly access their desktops or to create a new one.
- Docking: When the user undocks a laptop, the windows on the monitor will be minimized, and when the laptop is redocked to a monitor, Windows will put everything where it was before.

== Input ==
- Touch Keyboard: Windows 11 introduces thirteen new themes to customize the touch keyboard, including 3 hardware-matching themes that match the Surface keyboard colors. It also adds a new theme engine that allows the user to create a custom theme using background images. In addition, Windows 11 adds the ability to resize the touch keyboard.
- Voice Typing: Windows 11 includes a new voice typing launcher to easily start voice typing in a selected field. It is turned off by default, but it can be turned on in Settings and placed in any area of the screen.
- Touch Improvements: Windows 11 also features an improvement to touch-based interactions. Tablet mode is removed; instead, Windows will automatically adapt when needed. New and improved gestures can be used on tablets and touchscreens. App windows now have larger touch targets and will automatically arrange themselves in split view when the screen is rotated. Windows 11 seems to be optimized for desktops and tablets instead of prioritizing the latter like Windows 8, prioritizing the latter like Windows 8.1, or separating them both and Windows 10.
- Pen Menu: For digital pen users, a new pen menu has been added, which is accessible by clicking the pen icon on the taskbar. By default, it contains two apps that can be customized by clicking the gear icon and selecting "Edit pen menu". In the flyout, users can add up to four of their favorite drawing or writing apps to the pen menu to open them quickly when using a pen.
- Language and Input Switcher: A switcher that will show up next to the Quick Settings menu allows the user to switch languages and keyboard layouts. Users can press the Windows + Spacebar keyboard shortcut to toggle between input methods.

== Display improvements ==
- Dynamic refresh rate automatically increases the refresh rate when scrolling or when using the inking function in some applications. It can also lower the refresh rate, when possible, to save battery power.
- Display refresh rate higher than 500Hz.
- Auto HDR.
- Content adaptive brightness control (CABC).
- HDR support to color-managed apps.
- HDR certification.
- DirectStorage: Originally introduced with the Xbox Series X and Series S, it requires a graphics card supporting DirectX 12 Ultimate, and an NVMe solid-state drive. In Windows 11, DirectStorage can use I/O Ring.

== Hardware support ==
- Supports WPA3.
- Supports NVMe 2.0.
- Supports I/O Ring.
- Since Windows 11, Device Manager supports to view and manage installed drivers with click "View - Drivers".
- Supports AAC codec for Bluetooth audio.

== Windows Subsystem for Android (WSA) ==
Windows 11 allows users to install and run Android apps on their devices using the new Windows Subsystem for Android (WSA) and the Android Open Source Project (AOSP). This runs with Intel Bridge Technology, a runtime post-compiler that enables apps written for other architectures to run on x86. These apps can be obtained from the Microsoft Store via the Amazon Appstore, or through other sources.

On March 5, 2024, Microsoft announced the termination of this feature in the updated support document of WSA: "As a result, the Amazon Appstore on Windows and all applications and games dependent on WSA will no longer be supported beginning March 5, 2025. Until then, technical support will remain available to customers".

== Windows 11 on ARM ==
In Windows 11 on ARM, CHPE is replaced by ARM64EC (Emulation Compatible), a superset of ARM64 which combines ARM64 and x86 code (32-bit and 64-bit), allowing apps to be incrementally transitioned from emulated to native. Arm64X binaries were also introduced to support classic Arm64 code and Arm64EC code together. Windows 11 added support for OpenCL 1.2 via CLon12 and OpenGL 3.3 via GLon12, open source OpenCL and OpenGL implementations on top DirectX 12 via Mesa Gallium. Version 22H2 updated the .NET Framework adding native ARM64 support. Version 23H2 added support for vTPM in Hyper-V.

== Bundled software ==
- Microsoft Store, which serves as a unified storefront for apps and other content, is also redesigned in Windows 11. Microsoft now allows developers to distribute Windows API, progressive web applications, and other packaging technologies in the Microsoft Store, alongside the standard Universal Windows Platform apps. The new Microsoft Store will also enable users to install Android apps onto their devices via the Amazon Appstore. This feature will require a Microsoft account, an Amazon account, and a one-time install for Windows Amazon Appstore client.
- Microsoft Teams: This collaboration platform is directly integrated into Windows 11. Skype is no longer bundled with the OS. Teams will appear as an icon in the Windows taskbar, letting users message and call their contacts instantly.
- Settings: The app has been redesigned to be visually pleasing and easy to use in Windows 11. It has a left-handed navigation that persists between pages, and it adds breadcrumbs as the user navigates deeper into the settings to help them know where they are and to not get lost. The Settings app also includes brand new pages, with new controls at the top that highlight key information and frequently used settings for the user to adjust to their content. These new controls span across several category pages like System, Bluetooth & devices, Personalization, Accounts and Windows Update. It also adds expandable boxes for pages with many settings.
- Snipping Tool: In Windows 11, both the legacy Snipping Tool and newer Snip & Sketch apps have been replaced by a new Snipping Tool app with the combined functionality of both apps. It includes a new user interface similar to the legacy Snipping Tool with extra features like the Windows + Shift + S keyboard shortcut from Snip & Sketch and richer editing. Windows 11 also introduces a new Settings page for the Snipping Tool. In addition, the new Snipping Tool adds support for dark mode.
- Calculator: Like the Snipping Tool, Calculator includes a new app theme setting. The Calculator has been completely rewritten in C# and includes several new features.
- Mail and Calendar: These apps have been updated with a new visual style. They include rounded corners and other adjustments to make them look and feel more inclusive on Windows 11.
- Photos: The Photos app has been updated with a new viewing experience, editing features, Fluent Design, WinUI controls, rounded corners, and more. Photos app, which would be set up as the default image viewer in Windows 11, will allow users to explore collections, albums, and folders. The Collection feature remains unchanged, and it will show the most recent photos and screenshots, organized in proper order by date. Albums are also generated automatically using Microsoft's UI technology, but users can always customize the experience with their own albums. The Photos app also introduces a floating menu with new editing controls and will let users compare up to four pictures at once.
- Tips: Windows 11 introduces a refreshed Tips app with a new look and additional UI updates. It comes with over 100 new tips to get started with Windows 11 or to learn new things.
- Paint: One of the oldest Windows apps, which remained unchanged since Windows 7, has been given an updated user interface with rounded corners and the Mica material for Windows 11. The most prominent change to Paint is a new simplified toolbar, a rounded color palette, and a new set of drop-down menus. AI features have also been introduced, including background removal and an ability to generate images from text descriptions using DALL-E technology.
- Notepad and Voice Recorder also feature refreshed interfaces. These apps now feature designs adhering to the Fluent Design principles.
- The Microsoft Office apps have been redesigned to align with Fluent Design.
- Windows 11 also features a new Media Player app, which acts as a replacement for Windows 10's Groove Music app.
- Xbox app: An updated Xbox app is bundled with Windows 11. Features such as Xbox Cloud Gaming and Xbox Game Pass are integrated directly into the app.

== Security and performance ==
Microsoft promoted performance improvements such as smaller update sizes, faster web browsing in "any browser", faster wake time from sleep mode, and faster Windows Hello authentication.

As part of the minimum system requirements, Windows 11 only officially supports devices with a Trusted Platform Module 2.0 security coprocessor. According to Microsoft, TPM 2.0 is a "critical building block" for protection against firmware and hardware attacks. In addition, Microsoft now requires devices with Windows 11 to include Virtualization-Based Security (VBS), Hypervisor-Protected Code Integrity (HVCI), and Secure Boot built-in and enabled by default. The operating system also features hardware-enforced stack protection for supported Intel and AMD processors for protection against zero-day exploits. Windows 11 Home SKUs require an Internet connection and a Microsoft account for first-time setup.

== See also ==
- New features by Windows version:
  - XP
  - Vista
  - 7
  - 8
  - 10
  - 11
- Removed features by Windows version:
  - XP
  - Vista
  - 7
  - 8
  - 10
  - 11
