= List of features removed in Windows 10 =

Windows 10 is a version of Windows NT and the successor of Windows 8.1. Some features of the operating system were removed in comparison to Windows 8 and Windows 8.1, and further changes in by now discontinued features have occurred within subsequent feature updates to Windows 10. The removed features are listed as follows (both original and later releases).

== Features removed in version 1507: (RTM) ==
=== Windows shell ===
- The charms are removed, and replaced with the Security and Maintenance. In Windows Runtime apps, a menu button appears on the title bar that can be used to access the functions that previously required its usage.
- Users are no longer able to synchronize Start menu layouts across all devices associated with a Microsoft account. A Microsoft developer justified the change by explaining that a user may have different applications they want to emphasize on each device that they use, rather than use the same configuration across each device. The ability to automatically install a Windows app across all devices associated with an account was also removed.
- Dragging and dropping items from or within the start menu and the list of recent files (accessible from right click on a taskbar shortcut) is no longer possible.

=== System components ===
- User control over Windows Updates is removed (except in enterprise versions). In earlier versions, users could opt for updates to be installed automatically, or to be notified so they could update as and when they wished, or not to be notified; and they could choose which updates to install, using information about the updates. Windows 10 Pro and Enterprise users may be configured by an administrator to defer updates, but only for a limited time. Under the Windows end-user license agreement, users consent to the automatic installation of all updates, features and drivers provided by the service, and implicitly consent "without any additional notice" to the possibility of features being modified or removed. The agreement also states, specifically for users of Windows 10 in Canada, that they may pause updates by disconnecting their device from the Internet.
- Drivers for external (USB) floppy drives are no longer integrated and must be downloaded separately.
- While all Windows 10 editions include fonts that provide broad language support, some fonts for Asian languages (Arabic, Chinese, Hindi, Japanese, Korean, etc.) are no longer included with the standard installation "to reduce the amount of disk space that Windows requires", but are available without charge as optional font packages. When software invokes text in languages other than those for which the system is configured and does not use the Windows font fallback mechanisms designed always to display legible glyphs, Windows displays unsupported characters as a default "not defined" glyph, a square or rectangular box, or a box with a dot, question mark or "x" inside.
- The ability to create MS-DOS bootdisks has been removed. This means the last remnant of MS-DOS (aside from NTVDM in 32-bit editions) has been removed.

=== Media features ===
- Windows Media Center introduced in Windows XP Media Center Edition is discontinued, and is uninstalled when upgrading from a previous version of Windows. Upgraded Windows installations with Media Center will receive the paid app Windows DVD Player free of charge for a limited, but unspecified, time. Microsoft had previously relegated Media Center and integrated DVD playback support to a paid add-on beginning on Windows 8 due to the cost of licensing the required DVD playback related patents, and the increasing number of PCs that have no optical drives.

=== Internet and networking ===
- Web browsers can no longer set themselves as a user's default without further intervention; changing the default web browser must be performed manually by the user from the "Default apps" page in Settings app, ostensibly to prevent browser hijacking and to encourage existing Windows users to use Microsoft Edge as their primary web browser.
- Parental controls no longer support browsers other than Internet Explorer and Edge, and the ability to control browsing by a whitelist was removed. Also removed was the ability to control local accounts, and the ability to scan a machine for applications to allow and block.

=== Bundled software ===
- The Food & Drink, Health & Fitness, and Travel apps have been discontinued.
- Starting with Windows 10, Microsoft does not offer WinHelp viewer for this (or higher) version. The last version of Windows on which it was possible to open WinHelp files, using a downloadable component, is Windows 8.1.

=== Features restored in later versions ===
- Windows Defender could be integrated into File Explorer's context menu in Windows 8.x, but Microsoft initially removed integration from Windows 10, restoring it in version 1511 (with build 10571) in response to user feedback.
- The OneDrive built-in sync client, which was introduced in Windows 8.1, no longer supports offline placeholders for online-only files in Windows 10. This functionality was re-added in Windows 10 version 1709, under the name "Files On-Demand".

== Features removed in version 1511 ==
- Location-aware printing, a feature of Windows 7 (originally intended for Windows Vista during its development) that allowed users to specify default printers for individual network locations, then automatically switch between printers when changing networks is no longer available.
- 'The Tap and Send functionality of Windows 8.1 to receive and send content across devices supporting near-field communication is no longer available.

== Features removed in version 1607 ==
- Cortana can now operate in a feature-limited mode with basic web and device search functionality, if users have not opted into data collection and personalization. On previous versions, a generic "Search" experience without Cortana branding was shown if the user had not granted permission to activate Cortana.
- In April 2016, Microsoft announced that it will no longer allow Cortana web searches to be executed through any other web browser and search engine combination but Microsoft Edge [Legacy] and Bing, intentionally disregarding user settings. Microsoft alleges that other web browsers and search engines results in a "compromised experience that is less reliable and predictable", and that only Microsoft Edge [Legacy] supports direct integration with Cortana within the browser itself.
- The ability to change the Exit Windows, Windows Logoff, and Windows Login sounds was hidden in Version 1607, although these features can be enabled by going to the Windows Registry and under the EventLabels folder and setting the value to 0. However, even changing these sounds in the sounds panel has not had any effect since Windows 8.
- Certain features related to embedded advertising in the operating system can no longer be disabled on non-Enterprise or Education versions of Windows 10 using management settings such as Group Policy, including disabling Microsoft Store and Universal Windows Platform apps, "Microsoft consumer experiences" (which pushes tiles to the Start menu advertising promoted Microsoft Store apps, typically following a new installation of Windows 10), Windows Tips, turning off the lock screen (which can optionally display ads as part of "Spotlight" tips), or enforcing a specific lock screen background. Critics argued that this change was meant to discourage Windows 10 Pro from being used in business environments, since Microsoft was reducing the amount of control administrators have over their devices' environments without using an enterprise version of Windows 10.
- The ability to share Wi-Fi credentials with other contacts via Wi-Fi Sense was removed; Wi-Fi passwords can still be synced between devices tied to the same Microsoft account.
- Support for AGP video cards was removed in this version without any official announcement. Attempting to use an AGP video card in version 1607 or newer will fail and the card will display error code 43 or run in PCI mode depending on the card and board.

== Features removed in version 1703 ==
- Windows 10 is no longer supported on devices containing an Intel Atom "Clover Trail" system-on-chip. Affected devices may not be upgraded to 1703 or any future feature updates of Windows 10. Microsoft will continue to provide security patches for version 1607 (the build has a long-term support version for enterprise markets) on these devices through January 2023.
- Windows Update will no longer postpone the download of certain critical updates if the device is connected to a network that was designated by the user as being "metered". Although meant to prevent the updates from utilizing data allotments, this behavior had been used as a workaround by users to avoid the requirement for all updates to be automatically downloaded.
- The Interactive Service Detection service, introduced in Windows Vista to combat shatter attacks, is removed in 1703.
- Briefcase files and shell and sync functionality has been fully removed. Previously it was disabled in Windows 8 but could be enabled with a Registry tweak.

== Features removed in version 1709 ==
- The Syskey utility is removed, with Microsoft citing insecure cryptography and increasing use as ransomware in tech support scams.
- Server Message Block version 1 (SMB1) is disabled by default on version 1709. The Home and Pro editions only disable the SMB1 server but retain the SMB1 client, so they can connect to SMB1 network shares. The Enterprise and Education editions disable the SMB1 entirely. This version of the 30-year-old protocol gained notoriety in the WannaCry ransomware attack, although Microsoft had been discouraging its use even before.
- 3D Builder is no longer installed by default. As of July 2024, 3D Builder is no longer supported and it was removed from the Microsoft Store.

== Features removed in version 1803 ==
- Games Explorer first introduced in Windows Vista has been removed. Running the command shell:games will open an error message.
- Language options in Control Panel, first featured in Windows 8, have been moved to Windows Settings.
- By default, Windows 10 no longer automatically backs up the Registry in the RegBack folder. Microsoft recommends using System Restore instead.
- HomeGroup, a home network file sharing feature first introduced in Windows 7 is removed.
- XPS Viewer is no longer installed by default on new installations.
- The Phone Companion app is deprecated, with its functionality moved to the Settings app.

== Features removed in version 1809 ==
- Windows 10 setup made it more difficult to create a local user account not linked to a Microsoft account if the PC is able to connect to the internet during the setup process.
- The Hologram app has been replaced by the Mixed Reality Viewer.

== Features removed in version 1903 ==
- The sync feature of the desktop version of the Messaging app has been removed.
- The "Product alert" button in Microsoft Paint present from version 1703 onwards, which advised users that Paint would be replaced by Paint 3D, was removed.

== Features removed in version 1909 ==
- Roaming of Taskbar settings is removed.
- The Peer Name Resolution Protocol (PNRP) cloud service was removed in Windows 10, version 1809. It's been planned to complete the removal process by removing the corresponding APIs.
- The Explorer search box no longer shows the key words for Advanced Query Syntax nor does it populate their values, although the Advanced Query Syntax for Windows Search can still be used.

== Features removed in version 2004 ==
- Certain capabilities of Cortana have been removed, such as music and connected home.
- Windows To Go introduced in Windows 8 and included up to Windows 10 version 1909 is removed.
- The Mobile Plans and Messaging apps are removed for non-cellular devices and are not installed by default.

== Features removed in version 21H1 ==
- Adobe Flash Player is removed from Control Panel\System and Security.

== Features removed in version 22H2 ==
- The ability to install feature updates cumulatively is no longer available in version 22H2 as it requires at least version 2004 to be installed first.
- Since IE11 was disabled, the option to set Internet Explorer as the default browser in Internet Settings has been removed. However, shortcuts to the browser remain. This can also be seen in Windows 11.
- The wider search bar in File Explorer has been replaced with the pre-1909 search bar, starting with the KB5034203 and KB5034122 updates.

== Deprecated features ==
Microsoft has published a list of Windows features that are no longer actively developed. Microsoft states that these features may potentially be changed or removed in future updates to Windows 10.

- My People in the shell no longer developed. It was discontinued in early 2025 and replaced by a new Outlook for Windows web app.
- Skype was discontinued on May 5, 2025 on all Windows 10 editions, and the website now redirects users to Microsoft Teams. As usual, the Skype Dial Pad remains functional for users with paid services.
- Hyper-V vSwitch on LBFO (to be bound via Switch Embedded Teaming)
- Package state roaming for UWP apps (being replaced by Azure App Service)
- ReFS (volumes can only be created on Windows 10 Pro for Workstations and Enterprise)
- Snipping Tool (replaced by Store app Snip & Sketch)
- Microsoft 3D Viewer was retired on June 30, 2026, and replaced with Babylon.js.
- WordPad (restricting support from May 11, 2027 to LTSC editions, enterprises and only for embedded and industrial systems, to be replaced with the free version of Microsoft Word for .doc and .rtf, and Windows Notepad for editing .txt files)
- Language Community tab in Feedback Hub
- Software Restriction Policies (replaced primarily by AppLocker and Windows Defender Application Control)
- System Image Backup
- Internet Explorer (permanently disabled by a Microsoft Edge update on SAC versions on February 14, 2023)
- Windows Hello Companion Device Framework API for external devices to unlock Windows logon when biometrics are unavailable
- Dynamic Disks (will be replaced by Storage Spaces in a future update)
- Math Input Panel (will be replaced by Math Recognition in a future update)
- An x86-64-v2 CPU supporting SSE4.2 and POPCNT CPU instructions is enforced.

== See also ==
- New features by Windows version:
  - XP
  - Vista
  - 7
  - 8
  - 10
  - 11
- Removed features by Windows version:
  - XP
  - Vista
  - 7
  - 8
  - 10
  - 11
