= List of features removed in Windows 7 =

While Windows 7 contains many new features, a number of capabilities and certain programs that were a part of previous Windows versions up to Windows Vista were removed or changed.

The following is a list of features that were present in Windows Vista and earlier versions but were removed in Windows 7.

== Windows shell ==
=== Windows Explorer ===
- Column headers for item properties only appear in the Details icon view mode. Additionally, even in Details view, column headers in Windows 7 only allow filtering items; there no longer are options in drop-down menus to group, sort, or stack items (Sort, Group, and Stack by Property options are removed). Filtering can only be done in Details view; grouping must be done from the context menu in every icon view mode; and sorting must be done by either clicking the column header itself in Details view, or by selecting the Sort By context menu in all other icon view modes. In Windows Vista, column headers could be used to filter, group, sort, and stack items regardless of the active icon view mode.
- Control Panel views are limited to Category, Small icons, and Large icons (which is actually Tiles view). List, Details, Extra large icons, Large icons, and Medium icons view modes are no longer available. The abilities to group or sort Control Panel items are also removed.
  - Control Panel settings including Add Hardware, Bluetooth, Game Controllers, Offline Files, Pen and Touch, People Near Me, Scanners and Cameras, and Tablet PC Settings are not listed even under All Control Panel Items. The 32-bit Speech applet is no longer accessible through the Control Panel. Some of these settings are accessible only from within Category view, or by searching, but they can be made accessible via modifications to the Windows Registry.
- Disabling Auto Arrange and Align to Grid is not available in Windows Explorer windows. As a result, users can no longer manually arrange items via drag and drop within a folder; this feature is only available on the desktop.
- Each toolbar or desk band is forced to be on its own row in Windows Explorer. Windows Explorer forces the RBBS_BREAK style for every band.
- Full row selection for icons in the Details icon view mode cannot be disabled, which was possible in Windows Vista.
- Icons no longer appear on the Command Bar in Windows Explorer.
- IDeskBand interface and Explorer Bars are no longer supported in Windows Explorer; they are still supported in Internet Explorer.
- In Folder Options, the Remember each folder's view settings option that allowed Windows Explorer to retain folder icon view modes and icon sizes on a per-folder basis has been removed.
- If the sort criteria is changed when more than one item is selected — for example, if the user first sorts by name then by date — all selected items will be de-selected.
- It is not possible to open Windows Explorer (or even temporarily open a Windows Explorer window) as an administrator without modifying permissions of system values in the Windows Registry, due to a DCOM restriction.
- It is not possible to run the 32-bit version of Windows Explorer as a file manager or as the shell in 64-bit editions of Windows 7. 64-bit editions of Windows Vista and Windows XP allowed executing the 32-bit shell/Windows Explorer and making it the default for compatibility with shell extensions. As a result, all 32-bit shell extensions are incompatible with 64-bit versions of Windows 7.
- Items view control, an undocumented control that is incompatible with the List view control replaces the List view control used in Windows Explorer and Start Menu breaking applications that customized the Explorer list view control. The Item view also does not support custom positioning, custom ordering, or hyperlinks, which the Windows Vista list view did support. Because the control is undocumented, it is not possible for developers to disable auto arrange or customize views. Because ItemsView is not considered part of the Win32 common controls reusable by developers, the sound for the Select system event no longer plays in Explorer in Windows 7.
  - The new items view control also ignores certain desktop.ini parameters like IconArea_Image and IconArea_Text preventing users from setting a background picture for folders. In Windows Vista, this feature was not built-in, however the list view control supported this if shell extensions or folder customization utilities which set the correct desktop.ini parameters and attributes were installed.
- Registry settings pertaining modified colors for compressed files, EFS-encrypted files, and item hot-tracking effects are ignored by the ItemsView control in Windows Explorer.
- The Navigation Pane no longer allows the tree view to be collapsed; in Windows Vista, it was possible to either show only the folder tree view or collapse this view to show only the new Favorite Links.
- The Navigation Pane no longer includes a horizontal scrollbar, or the ability to automatically scroll horizontally that was introduced in Windows Vista.
- The Navigation Pane no longer includes an option to display dotted lines to visually represent to the user how folders and subfolders are connected; in Folder Options, the Display simple folder view in Navigation Pane option is removed.
  - Similarly, when clicking on a folder in the Navigation Pane, it isn't automatically expanded to show its subfolders, as the Display simple folder view in Navigation Pane option is removed.
- The Slide Show button on the Command Bar in Windows Explorer starts the new Windows Photo Viewer which, unlike Windows Photo Gallery or Windows Live Photo Gallery does not support themes or rich transitions.
- The Public folder introduced in Windows Vista is no longer listed among the items in the hierarchy of the breadcrumb bar; users who wish to open this folder from the address bar must enter its full path.
- The Share overlay icon for shared items in Windows Explorer has been removed; this change means that users must now select a folder each time, every time to determine if it is being shared. The Share overlay icon was a feature of Windows since Windows NT 3.1.
- The Sharing Wizard introduced in Windows Vista no longer includes an option to create a new user when sharing an item (Create a new user...).
- The Software Explorer feature of Windows Defender has been removed; as a result, there are no longer notifications if User Account Control blocks a startup application that required elevation.
- The status bar in Windows Explorer no longer shows the size of a selected item(s).
- When items are grouped, selection of multiple groups by clicking the group header while holding down the Ctrl key is not possible as could be done in Windows Vista.
- When multiple items are selected in a Windows Explorer window, this selection is not retained if the user navigates back or forward.
- When navigating to a folder from a library, it is not possible to view the folder's contents in the view the user has set or customized; the folder uses the library's view.
- Windows 7 removes the Customize tab for a folder if its properties are opened via Libraries. If the same folder is opened in Windows Explorer without accessing it via Libraries, the Customize tab is available.
- Windows Explorer cannot be configured to retain individual folder window positions and sizes; each window shares the same size, and the position of each window is cascaded as new windows are opened.

=== Taskbar ===
- 16-bit applications can no longer display their icon on the taskbar when running. The taskbar instead shows the icon for NTVDM.exe, which is the 32-bit host process for running 16-bit applications.
- Always on Top for the taskbar is mandatory in Windows 7; in previous versions of Windows this was possible to disable.
- Clicking a grouped application's taskbar button or thumbnail when it is active (in the foreground) does not minimize it unlike in previous Windows versions; only ungrouped application buttons minimize upon being clicked again.
- Floating deskbands (toolbars) are no longer available. The feature was previously deprecated in Windows Vista; all toolbars can only be located on the taskbar. It is no longer possible to place toolbars on the other (non-taskbar) edges of the desktop.
- Grouping (placing next to each other) taskbar buttons belonging to the same application cannot be disabled; users can still disable combining multiple taskbar buttons of the same type under a single button.
- Icons have been removed from the tooltips for the notification area Date and Time, Network, Power, and Volume system icons.
- Network activity animation on the Network system icon in the notification area is no longer available; the icon now only shows the type of network being used and whether Internet connectivity is established.
- Quick Launch was deprecated and removed from the taskbar in favor of pinned applications. It is possible to revert to Quick Launch by manually adding it as a custom toolbar referencing %AppData%\Microsoft\Internet Explorer\Quick Launch if users prefer the taskbar layout from earlier versions of Windows, although Windows 7 and later have issues with Quick Launch getting automatically disabled and all its settings getting reset after a log off or restart.
- Power plans listed under the Power system icon are limited to Balanced and Power saver (with the High Performance power plan being available in the Control Panel); in Windows Vista, the all three power plans were available for use from the system icon, and user-created custom plans would also be available.
- The configurable registry option TaskbarGroupSize, which allowed fine-grained control over taskbar grouping in previous versions of Windows is not supported. In Windows 7, users can only configure to combine buttons, not combine buttons, or combine when the taskbar is full.
- The context menu of the Power system icon no longer features a link to open the Windows Mobility Center.
- The number of combined taskbar windows is not calculated and shown next to the combined buttons regardless of how many windows are open (i.e., three windows in one combined set do not list '3' next to the combination's name); users must determine this for themselves.
- The Show window preview (thumbnails) option of Windows Vista in Taskbar and Start Menu Properties that allowed users to disable taskbar thumbnails while Windows Aero was active is no longer available.
- Tooltips for application icons only show the name of the application; they no longer show the comment field.
- When grouping is disabled, the ability to manage multiple taskbar items using the CTRL key and clicking with the secondary mouse button to cascade, close, minimize, or tile the selected group windows is no longer available.
- When the taskbar is vertical, there cannot be multiple columns of icons.

=== Start menu ===
- Applications can no longer be excluded from appearing in the Most Frequently Used list of the Start menu by using the NoStartPage registry value as was possible in Windows XP and Windows Vista.
- Applications started from locations outside of the Start menu (such as from the Desktop, the Run dialog, or from folders) no longer appear in the Most Frequently Used unless launched at least once from the Start menu.
- Dynamically pinning default web browser and e-mail client programs on the Start menu is no longer possible. Programs can still be, however, manually pinned to the Start menu in Windows 7.
- Internet Explorer Favorites and History are no longer grouped under a separate header in the Windows 7 Start Menu as they were in the Windows Vista Start Menu. They are shown under the Files group.
- Search communications and Search favorites and history options from Windows Vista for the Start menu in Taskbar and Start Menu Properties are no longer available.
- The classic Start menu interface introduced in Windows 95 and included up to Windows Vista is no longer available in Windows 7 since build 6469. In addition, certain features that were present only in the classic Start menu — expanding menu columns for files and programs instead of scrolling, expanding folders by hovering instead of clicking, opening folders by double clicking, launching multiple programs by holding down ⇧ Shift key while clicking, and creating expandable shortcuts to folders by dragging them to the Start menu — are no longer available; however, it is possible to create a taskbar toolbar with functionality that approximates the classic Start menu, and applications such as Classic Shell can be used for this feature.
- The Lock button introduced in Windows Vista is no longer available on the Start menu; users can still specify that locking the computer should be the default action for the power button, but Windows Vista included a lock button in addition to the same configurable power button.
- When searching for items, Windows Vista provided an option to specify that only the Windows Search Index should be used when searching — instead of searching for items themselves — from the Start menu, but Windows 7 only provides options to include or exclude Public folders from search results.

=== Windows Search features ===
- Arrange By (called Stack By in Windows Vista) is now only available for libraries and folders included in libraries (when it was available for all folders and all Saved Searches in Windows Vista). Users can now only stack items by predefined properties depending on the library type in Windows 7. For example, in the Music library, users can only stack by Album, Artist, and Genre, but in Windows Vista, users could stack items by any valid property that exists for a music item (e.g., Album, Artist, Genre, Part of Set, Period, Sample Rate, Track Number, and Year).
- Compositional stacking introduced in Windows Vista is no longer available for all items; users can still stack items, but they cannot browse into one stack then navigate into another stack.
- Column header drop-down menus now display dates of items ordered from the oldest to the most recent (e.g., A long time ago, Last month, Last week, Today) instead of displaying them by order from the most recent to the oldest (e.g., Today, Last week, Last month, A long time ago) as in Windows Vista.
- Saved Searches in the Searches folder from Windows Vista (Recent Documents, Recent E-mail, Recent Music, Recent Pictures and Videos, Recently Changed, and Shared By Me) have been removed.
  - Because of the removal of Shared By Me and the deprecation of the Is Shared property, the Sharing Wizard no longer includes a link to see all files being shared out by the currently logged in user (Show me all the files I am sharing...) and the Network and Sharing Center no longer includes a link to Show me all the files and folders I am sharing.
  - Recent Pictures and Videos, which showed all photos and videos acquired from a camera or scanner in the last 30 days is replaced by Imported Pictures and Videos, which is temporarily created when photos or videos are imported, and which shows only the items of the current acquisition session.
  - Shared By Me from Windows Vista, which displayed items directly shared out by the current user is not imitable in Windows 7 due to changes to properties related to sharing.
- Stack By context menu and property header options from Windows Vista are no longer available.
- The advanced query builder (Search Pane) of Windows Vista is no longer available. Due to the removal of this interface, it is not possible to change the scope of a search in Windows Explorer unless at least one search has already been performed, after which users can specify to search in a "Custom" scope. For Saved Searches or other views that stack items, changing the scope is no longer possible due to the absence of this query builder.
- The Indexing Options Control Panel applet for Windows Search no longer includes the diagnostic option that was available in Windows Vista (Restore Defaults) to reset the Index to its original settings and rebuild the Index after the computer restarts; it is only possible to delete and rebuild the Index during the current user session (Rebuild), which was also available in Windows Vista.
- The keyboard shortcut (↵ Enter and ⇧ Shift) to redirect a query in Windows Explorer to the Internet while performing a query is no longer available; users can still specify to search the Internet from Windows Explorer, but only through an interface option (Search again in:) after a search is already performed.
- The message that appeared when opening a Saved Search with impermissible arguments or parameters (This search can't be completed because there is something wrong with this search folder) (e.g., the Saved Search references a third-party property no longer installed on the operating system) of Windows Vista is no longer available; instead, a Saved Search with impermissible arguments or parameters in Windows 7 simply does not open when the user attempts to open it, which provides no indication to the user that there is an issue.
- The option to Always search file names has been removed from the Search tab in Folder Options.
- The protocol handler add-in to add network locations to the Index is not compatible with Windows 7; the Windows Search service needs to be installed and running on the remote computers to search them.
- The Is Shared property introduced in Windows Vista to determine whether an item is being shared is no longer a queryable property; it has been deprecated in favor of a new, non-queryable Sharing Status property, which means that users can no longer search for items based on whether they are shared (for example, to search for all items that have been shared).
- The Shared With property introduced in Windows Vista is no longer a queryable property; users can still filter a list of items based on the users or groups with whom they are shared, but they cannot find all items shared with a specific user or group or search for items based on this property (i.e., querying the Index for all items shared with the Everyone group on the local machine is not possible).
- When a query is persisted as a Saved Search, it retains the presentation of items in Windows Explorer that originally appeared when the query was saved; however, Windows 7 only presents items returned by Saved Searches in the new Content view mode (regardless of how the items are to be presented). In Windows Vista, items that match a query will be presented to the user in accordance with the presentation layout defined by the Saved Search.
  - Similarly, Saved Searches that stack items in Windows 7 only display stacks in a descending order (regardless of the presentation layout defined).
- When filtering items or searching for items after previously stacking them, stacks do not remain in view as they did in Windows Vista; instead, the items that match the new criteria are displayed. In Windows Vista, it was possible to navigate into a stack after filtering or searching to achieve the same result.
- While implemented as an alternative to Saved Searches, libraries do not support accessing an item via the path of a library when the actual file system path is not known; accessing an item through the path of a Saved Search in both Windows Vista and Windows 7 is possible (i.e., C:\Users\JohnSmith\ABC.search-ms\ABC.docx), but libraries do not provide such a faculty (i.e., Libraries\Documents\ABC.docx or C:\Users\JohnSmith\AppData\Roaming\Microsoft\Windows\Libraries\Documents.library-ms\ABC.docx does not access the item).

=== Pen and touch input ===
- Pointer Options of the Pen and Touch (Pen and Input Devices in Windows Vista) Control Panel applet is no longer available; users can no longer configure enabling or disabling pen cursors, or choose to show either pen cursors or mouse cursors when using pens to interact with the screen.
- The Touch Pointer toolbar in Windows Vista, which displays a button on the Windows taskbar to quickly show or hide the touch pointer interface when using touch input is no longer available.
- Under the Touch tab in Pen and Touch, the previous Practice using your finger instead of a mouse or a tablet pen option of Windows Vista that opened a wizard interface for training with touch input is no longer available.

=== Other Shell features ===
- About in bundled Windows applications such as Microsoft Paint or Windows Calculator (as well as winver) no longer displays the system's RAM capacity, a detail that was previously included in this dialog of NT-based Windows versions since Windows NT 3.5.
- Beginning with Windows 7, AutoPlay disables AutoRun entries and only supports optical media such as CDs and DVDs due to security issues associated with automatically executing content on portable flash media; Microsoft later backported this change to Windows XP and Windows Vista.
- Devices and Printers, which supersedes the Bluetooth Devices Control Panel applet of previous Windows versions, does not include column header properties introduced in Windows Vista by which to sort Bluetooth devices; in particular, the Address, Authenticated, Connection In Use, Discovery Method, Encrypted, Last Connected, Paired, and Version properties are no longer available, which means users cannot filter, group, or sort Bluetooth devices by these properties (for example, to view only devices with active connections, devices by connection types, or when devices were last connected to the machine). The former Bluetooth Devices applet is still available, but it is hidden by default.
- Command Prompt no longer displays the RAM usage (maximum: 190 MB at 9999×9999) when selecting large buffer grids.
- Games Explorer no longer supports changing command line switches, compatibility modes, icons, or start-in paths for games.
- Games Explorer no longer supports Rich Saved Games of Windows Vista, which allowed for creating a Shell handler to expose cover art and metadata of games to the Windows Shell for Windows Search.
- HD DVD is no longer an available option in AutoPlay.
- The Presentation Settings feature introduced in Windows Vista no longer includes an option to view a list of the connected displays (Connected displays...).
- The Snap To mouse pointer option to move the pointer automatically to the default button in a dialog is broken on many re-designed system and application dialog boxes and windows in Windows 7. The mouse pointer simply does not move or snap to the default button in several dialogs which are re-designed.
- Windows Network Diagnostics, when it did not detect a network connectivity error in Windows Vista, included a prompt for the user to queue and send a report with Windows configuration details to Microsoft; analysis of this data allowed for building solutions when an issue was known to the user but not detected. In Windows 7, this prompt is no longer available, and users are instead provided with additional troubleshooting options such as Help and Support or Remote Assistance (which were also accessible in Windows Vista).
  - Similarly, when a problem is resolved, the user does not have the option to send a report to Microsoft if another problem is suspected.

== Personalization ==
- In the Personalization control panel, it is not possible to save changes to an existing theme. Changes made after choosing a theme must be saved again and the original theme deleted to prevent duplication. In previous versions of Windows, a theme file could be overwritten with the modified theme.
- The Aurora, Windows Energy, and Windows Logo screensavers, and the wallpapers that shipped with Windows Vista were removed.
- The 3D-Bronze, 3D-White, Conductor, Dinosaur, Hands 1, Hands 2, Variations, and Windows Animated cursor schemes are removed and no longer available.
- ClearType cannot be turned off entirely in order for the user interface font, Segoe UI, to maintain optimal design for certain shell components and Windows Explorer. Parts of the user interface (such as the start menu and Explorer) still use ClearType regardless of setting.
- Icon size setting in the Advanced Appearance settings opened via Personalization dialog no longer affects icon sizes in Windows Explorer and on the Desktop.
- Windows Classic color schemes have been removed, only leaving Windows Classic (formerly "Windows Standard") and the High Contrast themes. It was later reused on Windows Server 2012 Beta.

== Sample content ==
- The Bear, Butterfly, and Lake sample videos and the sample pictures and music tracks that were bundled with Windows Vista were removed.

== Windows Media Player features ==
- The ability to lock the player while in full-screen mode using a 4-digit PIN has been removed.
- The option to adjust the bit rate when burning data CDs has been removed.
- Windows Media Player's taskbar-integrated Mini-player has been removed. The thumbnail preview which replaces this lacks volume control and a progress bar. The ability to start the miniplayer only for certain files based on specific text in their file names was also removed.
- Enhancements are only accessible from Now Playing view in a floating window. They do not dock to the Now Playing window, and do not get restored when Windows Media Player is restarted. Even when manually restored, their position does not get saved.
- Left/Right balance control has been removed from the graphic equalizer and is no longer possible.
- Several player preferences are not saved and restored upon restarting the player. The playlist pane in Now Playing view is not shown automatically. Enhancements do not get restored when Windows Media Player is restarted. Even when manually restored, the previous position of the Now Playing window and enhancements is not retained.
- The context menu entry "Find In Library" which allowed locating the Now Playing song in the library was removed.
- Advanced Tag Editor, Color Chooser, Media Link for E-mail, and Party Mode features have been removed.
- The ability to add and show static lyrics and synchronized lyrics has been removed.
- Recently added Auto playlist is not included by default.
- Total time for CDs and playlists is rounded up to the nearest minute, i.e. seconds are no longer shown.

== Internet Explorer features ==
- In Internet Explorer 8, the previous session can no longer be automatically restored the next time. The user must remember to manually open the session the next time.
- Internet Explorer 8 on any Windows version does not support inline AutoComplete in its address bar.
- Rating and description of Internet Explorer favorites can no longer be edited from the Details pane in Windows 7 Explorer.

== Applications replaced by Windows Live counterparts ==
- Windows Photo Gallery, Windows Movie Maker, and Windows Mail have been removed, in favor of downloading respective Windows Live counterparts, after they were discontinued in favor of third-party e-mail clients, photo and video software.
  - Windows Live Mail and Windows Live Movie Maker do not include all of the features of Windows Mail and Windows Movie Maker respectively.
  - Windows Live Mail does not support HTML source editing, scripted stationery and the ability to disable the splash screen.
  - The Windows Mail gadget for Windows SideShow does not ship with Windows 7.
  - Windows Live Movie Maker does not include a proper timeline with audio edits and narration, title overlays, filter compatibility settings and other advanced options, cannot export to DV-AVI, and drops the transitions and effects from Windows Movie Maker.
- The web filtering and activity reporting functionality from the in-box parental controls feature. Windows Live Family Safety replaces the web filtering functionality but its user interface for filtering and activity reporting is web-based instead of the native UI used by Windows Vista's parental controls and requires logging into a Windows Live ID (now Microsoft account). After, that services was discontinued in favor of third-party parental control software. Windows 7 retained time, game and program restrictions.
- Windows Calendar has also been removed, in favor of Windows Live Mail's calendar.
  - Windows Live Mail's integrated calendar supports events but not tasks, does not support subscribing, publishing, importing and exporting iCalendar files.
  - Windows Live Mail's integrated calendar also lacks a native events reminder. Events are reminded through e-mail instead.

== Other Windows applications and features ==
- To preserve the digital signature of a Windows Installer (MSI) file during uninstall, embedded cabinets are no longer automatically stripped off by Windows Installer 5.0 to save disk space. As a result, MSIs cached in the %Windir%\Installer directory take more disk space than earlier Windows versions with no option to disable the caching.
- Transient Multimon Manager (TMM), a Windows Vista feature to automatically detect hot-Plug and Play displays as well as configure and save the multi-monitor setup is removed in favor of Win+P.
- The Windows 7 On-screen keyboard removes the ability to change or specify the font as a result of which keyboard layouts of fonts which use Dingbats and Unicode characters in place of alphabetic characters can no longer be viewed.
- The Windows 7 On-screen keyboard removes direct access to function keys. Function keys are now accessed using the 'Fn' key.
- Windows Remote Assistance does not support file transfer and clipboard sharing in Windows 7.
- The Offline Files cache can be relocated, however, an existing cache with previously cached files cannot be moved without resetting it as was possible in Windows Vista using Windows Easy Transfer or in Windows XP/2000 using Cachemov.exe
- The DFS Replication Service included in Windows Vista for peer-to-peer DFS Replication service groups, has also been removed.
- The 3D visuals from WinSAT benchmark have been removed.
- Some features have been removed from Windows Defender such as the Software Explorer, configuration of security agents and notifications of program activities or when running startup programs as administrator. This is all backported to Windows XP and Windows Vista through the new version of Windows Defender.
- The ability to upgrade from Windows XP is no longer available in Windows 7 as it requires at least Windows Vista SP1 to be installed first.
- Removable Storage Manager (RSM) has been removed, so applications that depend on it—such as NTBackup or the NTBackup Restore Tool—cannot back up to physical or virtual tape drives.
- Windows Meeting Space, and the InkBall game have been removed.
- Windows Ultimate Extras for the Ultimate edition which included Windows DreamScene, Microsoft Tinker, and the Hold' Em poker game among others, was discontinued, and all installed extras were removed during an upgrade from Windows Vista to Windows 7. Microsoft had initially announced that they will re-offer Tinker and Hold 'Em in the near future. On December 15, only Tinker was made available for free as a Games for Windows – Live downloadable game which requires signing into Windows Live ID.
- Microsoft Agent 2.0 technology was removed, breaking compatibility with Microsoft Agent applications. A separate installation package has been provided by Microsoft "due to customer feedback."
- The sidebar for Desktop Gadgets was removed, although gadgets can align to any side of the screen like they did in Vista.
- The Contacts, Notes, and Stocks Desktop Gadgets have been removed. The Notes gadget has been replaced by Sticky Notes, allowing for both text and ink-based notes. An upgrade from Windows Vista to Windows 7 retains the user's notes from the gadget and transfers them to the Sticky Notes program.
- The import, export, drag and drop and voice note features in earlier versions of Sticky Notes have been removed.
- The Windows Firewall Control Panel does not allow configuring port-based filtering although the Windows Firewall with Advanced Security MMC-based snap-in allows this.
- Filtering policies in Group Policy to show only a specific operating system or application is no longer available.
- Software Restriction Policies no longer support multiple levels of trust such as "basic user" (only block or allow are still supported); this functionality has been superseded by User Account Control and AppLocker.
- The common font selector dialog box does not show the type of font (OpenType, TrueType, Symbol font, etc.)
- Windows Registry Reflection for x64 editions replaced with merged 32/64-bit keys.
- File backup to a network share (non-system image backup) is only available in Windows 7 Professional and above whereas it was included in Windows Vista Home Premium.
- Windows Import Video, a feature in Windows Vista which allowed one to import live or recorded video from a digital video camera and save it to the hard disk, has been removed.
- The option in Windows Vista to send search queries (keywords) of searches performed in the Control Panel category view to Microsoft has been removed in Windows 7.

== See also ==
- Windows Server 2008 R2
- New features by Windows version:
  - XP
  - Vista
  - 7
  - 8
  - 10
  - 11
- Removed features by Windows version:
  - XP
  - Vista
  - 7
  - 8
  - 10
  - 11
