= List of features removed in Windows Vista =

While Windows Vista contains many new features, a number of capabilities and certain programs that were a part of previous Windows versions up to Windows XP were removed or changed – some of which were later re-introduced in Windows 7 and later versions.

The following is a list of features that were present in Windows XP and earlier versions but were removed in Windows Vista.

== Windows Explorer ==
- Windows Briefcase no longer allows synchronizing items across multiple computers and a removable media device.
- Windows Briefcase cannot sync files or folders in locations protected by User Account Control. This removes the ability to sync many locations.
- Grouping items by name in Explorer no longer groups them under each individual letter of the alphabet (A, B, C... Z) like in Windows XP. When using Group By Name, items are always combined into just a few groups (A-H, I-P, Q-Z). This removes the ability to locate items by their first letter.
- If hidden files are not allowed to be shown in Windows Explorer, the Status bar does not report how many hidden files are present. In addition, if all items within a folder are selected at once (by pressing Ctrl+A or Select all), the user is not alerted to hidden files being selected.
- Even after setting the ForceCopyAclwithFile and MoveSecurityAttributes values as documented in KB310316, permissions are not retained/copied when Windows Explorer is used to copy or move objects across volumes or in the same volume. A hotfix is available (KB2617058) to restore the MoveSecurityAttributes value but not ForceCopyAclwithFile.
- Thumbnails can no longer be forced to regenerate by right-clicking the image and selecting Refresh thumbnail.
- Thumbnail support for .HTM, .HTML, .MHT and .URL files has been removed in Windows Vista.
- The Explorer thumbnail handler and metadata property handler for .AVI and .WAV files (Shmedia.dll) has been removed.
- Ctrl+Enter on the selected folder no longer opens it in a new Explorer window.
- Tiles view only shows the name, type and the size of items. It no longer shows information depending on the criteria by which items are sorted.
- The Version file properties tab has been replaced by a Details tab that omits custom version information strings, does not show all of the same information as the Version tab and does not support copying any of the displayed information to the clipboard.
- Various properties are not visible anymore from the Details tab, such as Audio sample rate and Audio sample size and Channels for certain audio files.
- The column by which items are sorted is not highlighted unlike Windows XP. Only the column header is highlighted.
- The address bar dropdown displays recently visited folder or file paths typed into the address bar and websites but does not show the complete top level file hierarchy.
- Right clicking on the top-left icon of the Explorer window no longer shows the context menu for that folder. It instead shows the window menu just like left click or Alt+Space does.
- The top-left corner of the window no longer acts like a draggable icon representing the folder.
- The Desktop.ini Sharing=0 parameter which could prevent a particular folder from being shared is not supported.
- The Up toolbar button in Windows Explorer, which allowed one to jump to a parent folder in the address hierarchy has been removed. As a result of this, the Ctrl+↑ key combination to open the parent folder in a new window does not work. The keyboard shortcut, Alt+↑, is still available. The link to the parent folder in the Other places task pane has also been removed. The new method of viewing parent folders is to click the respective folder or its dropdown arrow from the breadcrumbs bar.
- It is not possible to turn off full row selection in List view.
- It is not possible to turn off autorefresh/autosorting of files and folders as sorting is treated as a state instead of as a verb. As a result, any file modification activity such as copy-paste, creation, rename or deletion makes items move continually to obey the sort order instead of the items appearing at the end and getting sorted only when the view is refreshed.
- It is not possible to set NTFS security ACLs, ownership and audit permissions on more than one selected item using Windows Explorer because the Security tab has been removed from the Properties for multiple selected items. This feature was removed as the UAC prompt which may need to be displayed to gain ownership and reset permissions cannot accommodate the names of multiple selected files.
- The IColumnProvider shell extension interface (column handler) has been removed. Shell extensions that display information in Explorer's columns will therefore fail to work. As a result of this API removed, folder sizes cannot be displayed in a column in Windows Explorer Details view. The replacement for column handlers, Property Handlers, cannot be registered for all files.
- It is no longer possible to add a background to folders via a desktop.ini.
- Icons of any 16-bit files including New Executables or DLLs are not extracted by Explorer (or any other 32-bit process) even in 32-bit versions, and therefore are not displayed. The shell's Change icon dialog cannot browse 16-bit icon libraries and DLLs.
- The collapsible File and Folder Tasks pane actions have been replaced by the Organize menu which requires an additional click after selecting items.
- The navigation pane (tree view) can only be toggled through the Organize menu. The Folders button has been removed.
- The Favorites menu has been removed from Explorer (not from Internet Explorer) and replaced by Explorer-specific Favorite Links in the folder navigation pane (tree view). Favorites can now only store folder location shortcuts, unlike the Favorites menu in Windows XP which also supported program and file shortcuts.
- The ability to view and edit metadata at the file system level – such as description, author, tags, rating etc. stored in a file's secondary stream – through the "Summary" tab of the file's "Properties" dialog was removed. Metadata is now stored inside files; however, developers must write a Property handler for any file format in order for users to be able to edit and view its metadata.
- There are limitations to opening more than 15 selected files in a single operation, i.e. by selecting more than 15 files and pressing Enter. The "Open" verb is not present in the context menu when more than 15 files are selected.
- Single click to rename after selecting an item is not available in the navigation (left) pane.
- Arrows indicating subfolders in the left pane cannot be set to always show. They disappear when dragging and dropping if the user clicks in the right pane before starting to drag to the left pane.
- A folder tree does not expand automatically while collapsing the previous one in the navigation pane even after turning on "Display simple folder view".
- It is not possible to display the full path in the title bar when Aero Glass is enabled. When Aero Glass is disabled, the full path can be displayed in the title bar. The full path can be shown in the address bar regardless of the status of Aero, by clicking to the right of the breadcrumbs or pressing Alt+D.
- The ability to customize the standard toolbar's layout and buttons was removed.
- Users can no longer make the menu above all other toolbars.
- Ability to add a password to a ZIP file (compressed folder) has been removed. Though this has no effect on third-party compression tools, such as WinZip or 7-Zip, Windows Explorer can no longer open ZIP files that are protected with a password.
- Filmstrip view is replaced by the Preview pane; however the state of the preview pane is not saved per folder. It can be globally enabled or disabled. Also, the preview pane does not show previews for folders whereas filmstrip view showed the preview of images within a folder if a folder was selected. Other functions available in filmstrip view such as rotating photos and navigating using Next and Forward buttons are only available in Windows Photo Gallery.
- Support for enabling a folder for web sharing with Internet Information Services via the Windows Explorer interface was removed.
- The "Computer Description" field is no longer shown on the Explorer view of a workgroup. It can be viewed from the command line using net view.
- The Status bar does not show file information shown in the infotips when the file is selected. It no longer shows the total space used by a folder when displaying a folder's contents. Some file information is displayed in the Details pane.
- The drive mapping dialog box no longer allows a network path to be mapped without assigning a local drive letter to it.
- It is not possible to view the Properties of an item in the left pane of Windows Explorer using Alt+Enter.
- Users can no longer browse a domain or workgroup through a tree view. All computers on the network are displayed in a unified list. The list can be "filtered" to display only computers from the desired domain, but the list is still populated with all computers on the network, slowing the process.
- The ability to undo more than one delete operation has been removed from the Explorer context menu. Only the last delete operation can be undone or redone.
- The file transfer dialogs for copying, moving or deleting do not show the actual file name which is being copied, moved or deleted at that instant.
- The File Types tab has been removed from Folder Options. This feature was available from Windows 95 up to Windows XP and Windows Server 2003. The File Types tab allowed users to change the file associations for various types of files. It allowed configuring which application would open when a user clicked on a certain type of file, or allowed manually defining a new file extension, defining/editing custom secondary actions, showing extensions only for specific file types, or customizing the file icon. While there is a more simplified option to change the file associations, called Default Programs in the Windows Vista Control Panel, this option only allows users to change the default action that occurs when they double click a file. It does not allow users to choose which application would load if the user were to right click on a file and then choose a secondary option such as Edit. Manual registry editing or third-party software is now required to choose default programs, change file type icons, and other advanced tasks. The Open With dialog box in Windows Vista also uses the corresponding Default Programs API which limits only one registered application to be set as the default program.
- The option on the File Types tab to configure particular file types to confirm open after download and others to open without confirmation after downloading has been removed.
- Folders can only display two 3D thumbnails of files within a folder. Previously, up to four 2D images could be shown.

== Taskbar ==
- The Power icon on the taskbar only appears for laptops, and desktop computers with a USB-based UPS.
- The Network icon on the taskbar does not give direct access to the connection settings, connection status, firewall settings, or disabling the connection.
- The taskbar cannot be resized to zero height when unlocked, hiding it manually (users were unable to continue using the taskbar buttons after resizing the taskbar to zero height accidentally).
- Toolbars such as "Quick Launch" can no longer be "dragged off" the taskbar as floating minibars or docked to another edge of the screen, though physical folders can be dragged onto the desktop edge in a similar manner. The Language Bar is the only toolbar that can float on the desktop.
- Double clicking on the Printer icon in the notification area while printing does not open the printer's status window that allows managing print jobs.

== Start menu ==
- Neither the new nor the Classic Start menu shows infotips for folders stored inside the folder's desktop.ini.
- The All Programs mode has changed to an inline scrollable menu. As such, it is not possible to expand the All Programs menu in the Vista Start menu into flyout cascading menus.
- Subfolders inside the All Programs menu in the Vista Start menu cannot be opened in Windows Explorer by double clicking as was possible with the XP Start menu or Classic Start menu. They also do not expand automatically if the mouse hovers over them (unless working in Windows Classic mode).
- Holding down the SHIFT key while clicking an item to retain the Start menu is not possible in the Vista Start menu.
- The Vista Start Menu does not allow expanding Connect To and Printers for quick access to network connections or print/fax devices.
- The Log Off confirmation on the classic Start menu has been removed since Windows Vista build 5259.

== Other Windows shell and usability features ==
- The setting to configure Recycle Bin maximum allocated size globally (across all drives) has been removed and the equivalent Group Policy is not supported. Recycle Bin maximum size must be configured individually for each drive in MB.
- Some functionality of the shell namespace extension for the Downloaded Program Files folder which hosts ActiveX controls is broken. ActiveX controls no longer show "Update" and "Delete" context menu verbs when right clicked. As a result, they can no longer be updated or deleted using the Downloaded Program Files folder.
- Folders and sub-folders placed inside the Send To menu will no longer cascade i.e. expand as submenus. As a result, it is not possible to group items in the SendTo menu.
- AutoPlay settings cannot be configured per device; they are set globally.
- It is not possible to list fonts by similarity based on PANOSE information or hide font variations such as Bold, Italic, etc. in the Fonts folder.
- The option to switch between the Windows 2000/XP style "Fade" animation for menus and tooltips and the Windows 98/Me style "Scroll" animation has been removed. However, it is still possible to switch between the two options by registry editing.
- Some functions such as shell execute hooks and named exports have been deprecated or removed from shell32.dll.
- The Windows Script Host WshShell.SendKeys() method, as well as the SendKeys() function in development environments such as Visual Basic 6, no longer work on Vista when UAC is enabled. Version 3.0 of the .NET Framework has been updated to work around the issue.
- It is no longer possible to copy text fragments and other similar objects from a document, and paste them to a folder as a file (called a shell scrap object or "Document shortcut", but actually an OLE object).
- Active Desktop functionality has been removed. As a result, animated GIF files can no longer be set as the desktop background. No other dynamic web content such as HTML or HTA files can run on the desktop, although Windows DreamScene (exclusively for Windows Vista Ultimate) allows using videos as the background and dynamic web content can run as part of Sidebar gadgets.
- The Snap To mouse pointer option to move the pointer automatically to the default button in a dialog is broken on many system and application dialog boxes and windows in Windows Vista and later. The mouse pointer simply does not move or snap to the default button in several dialogs.

== Search ==
- Unlike the search feature in Windows XP, Windows Search does not display information about the location being searched in the status bar of Windows Explorer.
- It is not possible to perform a case sensitive search using Windows Search.
- Unlike the search feature in Windows XP, Windows Search no longer searches an item's NTFS Alternate Data Stream.
- The Search Companion is no longer available.

== Internet Explorer ==
- The About Internet Explorer dialog no longer displays the latest installed cumulative update in the "Update Versions" field. This is corrected in Internet Explorer 9 and later.
- The ability to customize the toolbar layout is removed. The position of the address bar and the 'command bar' cannot be readjusted.
- Internet Explorer is no longer integrated with Windows Explorer. This can also be seen in Internet Explorer 7/8 on Windows XP and Windows Server 2003.
- Image toolbar has been removed. Most of the commands that were on this floating toolbar – Save Picture, E-mail Picture, Set as Background, etc. – are now in the context menu that appears when an image is right-clicked. This is same for users with Internet Explorer 7 or higher on other supported Windows versions.
- Offline Favorites, a feature that automatically synchronized and stored web pages for later perusal when not online, was removed in favor of using RSS feeds.
- The maximum size for the "Temporary Internet Files" folder (downloaded files cache) is limited to 1024 MB in Internet Explorer 7. This also applies for Internet Explorer 7 on other Windows versions.
- Several old and little-used technologies have been removed: DirectAnimation support, CDF, view-source protocol handlers and 40-bit SSL ciphers.

== User accounts and winlogon.exe configuration ==
- It is no longer possible to safely relocate the profiles directory (C:\Users) to another partition without using unsupported methods. Microsoft recommends against moving the user profile folder. In Windows XP, the WinNT.sif file allowed relocating "Documents and Settings" to another partition than C: before Windows installation completed. Subfolders under the user's profile can however still be redirected. Windows 7 further alleviates this issue by introducing Libraries which allow user's data to be located on another partition.
- Windows Installer and the Shell in Windows Vista do not support per-user app installs without the need to show the UAC prompt. This has been corrected in Windows 7.
- Winlogon no longer shows details of password complexity policy requirements due to the removal of GINA.
- The Biologon API to programmatically create a new interactive user session using the InitiateInteractiveLogon function has been removed.
- Unlike Windows XP, an administrator can no longer unlock the computer when another standard user has locked it.
- Protected Storage (PStore) has been deprecated and therefore made read-only in Windows Vista. Microsoft recommends using DPAPI to add new PStore data items or manage existing ones. However existing applications such as Outlook 2002 which used PStore are unable to save passwords as a result. Any application that tries to create new PStore data items will fail.
- Although classic logon and Ctrl+Alt+Del enforcement can be enabled through Group Policy, the classic logon prompt cannot be made to appear by pressing Ctrl+Alt+Del at the Welcome screen twice. This makes it impossible to logon to a hidden user account while the Welcome screen is enabled (when Classic Logon is not enforced through Group Policy).
- Because of the classic logon being removed, domain names are no longer populated on the logon screen and cannot be selected from a drop down list.
- The ability to run a Control Panel applet as a different user by using Shift+Right click has been removed.
- It is not possible to override Autologon and Startup items by pressing the SHIFT key before logon. The IgnoreShiftOverride registry value is ignored. (This problem may be unique to USB keyboards; see KB977534, KB2526967)
- 16-bit applications launched with administrator-level privileges always run in their own memory space, even if launched via "Start /Shared" on the command line or if the CREATE_SEPARATE_WOW_VDM flag is specified with the CreateProcess() API; 16-bit inter-process communication therefore only works for non-elevated processes, as these can still be configured to run in the same memory space.
- The RunAs feature in the shell has been replaced with "Run as administrator" of User Account Control. The RunAs feature does not allow a local administrator-equivalent command shell to be started except for the Administrator account.
- Internet Explorer can no longer be launched from a command prompt started with alternate credentials using RunAs. This is also true for Internet Explorer 7 running under Windows XP (it can, but you must type the complete path to the executable, not just IEXPLORE or IEXPLORE.EXE).
- When User Account Control is enabled, any process started with Administrator-level privileges does not inherit the drive mappings of the interactively logged on user, despite the same account being used. This can lead to scenarios where non-UAC processes such as Windows Explorer have access to an application on a network drive, but insufficient permissions to execute it; conversely, the UAC-elevated process has sufficient local permissions, but cannot see the network application.
- The GINA library and support for GINA-based authentication has been replaced with Credential Providers so that authentication plug-ins are moved out of the Winlogon process space to the fullest extent possible in order to provide more reliability and consistency. Consequently, third-party GINA modules must be ported to the Credential Provider model. Credential providers however do not allow customization which GINA allowed. For example, it does not support programmatically using Fast User Switching.
- Winlogon Notification Packages are no longer supported in Windows Vista.
- The logon screen does not show the number of running programs or unread email messages when using Fast User Switching.
- The All Users wallpaper can no longer be changed. All Windows Vista machines now show the same wallpaper at the logon screen.
- Due to security concerns, the All Users screen saver can no longer be changed. (Replacing the screen saver was a common method of unauthorized privilege escalation in earlier versions of Windows.)
- Due to security concerns, system services can no longer natively interact with the user's desktop in Windows Vista. This is a change from all previous NT releases.
- Cached roaming profiles cannot be deleted directly from the file system as this renders the account unable to logon to the workstation again, even if the account is also removed from "HKEY_LOCAL_MACHINE\SOFTWARE\Microsoft\Windows NT\CurrentVersion\ProfileList". The only supported method of manually deleting a roaming profile is via the System applet of the Control Panel or via the commandline DelProf utility, which uses the DeleteProfile() API.
- The "Network Configuration Operators" built-in group no longer delegates permissions to manage system network connections; only system-wide administrator-level permissions can now be used to achieve this. Operations like the "Repair" action of a network connection can therefore be carried out by an administrator only.
- The ability to change the stored password of a domain in Stored User Names and Passwords while the computer is connected to a workgroup has been removed.
- The Stored User Names and Passwords credential manager does not accept the <Domain>\* syntax which allowed users to wildcard all passwords in a domain.

== Win32 console ==
- The Windows Display Driver Model (WDDM) does not support all DOS video modes and therefore DOS-based and Win32 console programs can no longer run in full-screen mode. If Windows XP Driver Model (XPDM) graphics drivers are installed or if booted into safe mode, console programs can be run in full-screen mode, however they do not support DWM and therefore Windows Aero.
- In previous versions of Windows, it was possible to save different settings for each console window. Windows would ask the user whether to apply settings for the current window or the shortcut that started the window. Windows Vista, however, saves settings for all console windows without asking the user.
- Dragging and dropping a folder or file into a Win32 console window no longer pastes the path of the folder or file. This no longer works as a result of User Interface Privilege Isolation.

== Graphics ==
- When using Windows Aero, all GDI, GDI+ and DirectDraw applications run in the new compositing window manager known as Desktop Window Manager. The GDI or DirectDraw render paths are redirected through DWM; however GDI or DirectDraw are not hardware-accelerated when they are redirected.
- Hardware overlays are not supported when Desktop Window Manager is enabled. Limited support for hardware overlays was reintroduced with Windows 7 for video playback.
- The Windows Display Driver Model specification does not support horizontal and vertical desktop spanned modes, that is, stretching the desktop across multiple monitors. although Dual View is still available.
- In Windows Vista, the Windows Display Driver Model (WDDM) does not support two different display adapters. When using two display adapters, both must use the same WDDM driver. Although Windows Vista still supports XPDM drivers, a WDDM driver is required for the Windows Aero user experience.
- Windows Vista restricts the amount of memory DPMI programs can have to 32 MB (33,554,432 bytes). The limitation applies to DPMI programs running inside NTVDM. The same is not true for previous versions of Windows.
- For certain CRT monitors, Windows Vista and later no longer support refresh rates higher than 85 Hz.

== Audio ==
- The ability to choose a different hardware or software MIDI synthesizer other than the default Microsoft GS Wavetable SW Synth has been removed from the user interface for audio configuration in Windows Vista. A different output MIDI synth or output device port can be selected only by editing the registry or using third party MIDI default output device configuration tools. Even though the default MIDI output device is changed, not all programs that use waveOut MME use the selected MIDI synth; they continue to use the default MS Software Synth. Also, not all MIDI synths are compatible with Windows Vista and later Windows versions.
- As DirectMusic was based on DirectSound which is no longer hardware accelerated in Windows Vista, DirectMusic also is software-emulated in Windows Vista. As a result, MIDI playback which is greatly sensitive to latency, timing and CPU usage can be choppy.
- Sounds cannot be played for balloon notifications anymore. This was partially rectified (but not corrected) in Windows 8 and later via toast notifications (especially for Windows 10, where all balloon notifications have been changed to toast notifications). Balloon notifications will still remain silent on Windows 8 onwards, even if they are re-enabled in Windows 10 and later.
- Sounds do not play for the Classic Start menu anymore, even though sounds have been assigned to "Menu command" and "Menu popup" events in Sound control panel.
- Some SAPI 5.1 and SAPI 5.2 voices and applications do not work in Windows Vista and later. Only SAPI 5.3 compatible voices and applications work.
- The controls to adjust per speaker/per channel volume have been removed from the volume mixer.
- It is not possible to minimize the volume control window or change its size using Ctrl+S.
- It is no longer possible to double click the Volume icon in the notification area to show the volume mixer.
- The position of the volume mixer window is not saved.
- In Windows XP, essentially, audio would be "broadcast" to all the audio endpoints at once. However, the new audio engine in Windows Vista changes this behaviour. Basically, audio can be sent only to the specific endpoint that the system has set by default, or which the user has configured via the Control Panel setting. Although this new audio behavior provides separate digital signal processing (DSP) capabilities, it is limiting in cases where audio has to be streamed to multiple devices such as headphones, speakers, HDMI out to AV receiver or analog audio to one device and digital to another.
- The ability to customize the Windows startup sound has been removed, however the logon and logoff sounds can still be customized.
- Windows Media Center drops support for the Caller ID and Windows Messenger features.
- In the Sound Control Panel applet, the ability to preview a sound from the Browse dialog box has been removed.
- The option to enable or disable digital CD audio is not available in the CD/DVD drive's properties in Device Manager.
- The ability to change the recording device to mono mixer or stereo mixer has been removed.
- Several features have been eliminated from Windows Sound Recorder, such as the ability to import sounds, change the speed, add an echo, play in reverse mode, inserting or mixing files.
- Windows Sound Recorder no longer saves to wave (.wav) format by default. Instead, it saves as Windows Media Audio (.wma) format. In the Home Basic N and Business N variants of Windows Vista, the wave format is still used by default. Windows 10's Voice Recorder (the modern equivalent to Windows Sound Recorder) only saves to the MPEG-4 (.m4a) format.
- PC Speaker is now deprecated and all programs utilizing PC Speaker will now be redirected to the existing default playback device instead.

== Windows Media Player features ==
- The List Pane no longer allows deleting or editing items by right clicking items.
- Categories in the player library such as Music, Pictures, Videos, Recorded TV show limited media information (metadata) columns, relevant only to their content type. In previous versions, all possible metadata columns were shown for all category types.
- Buttons to always show full-screen controls, show or hide the playlist while in full-screen mode and directly close Windows Media Player from full-screen have been removed.
- Auto sorting in the media library (similar to auto sorting in Windows Explorer) cannot be turned off.
- Grouping cannot be turned off. Library content is always grouped by the criteria by which it is sorted.
- The ability to add media to the library for searching local or network files and selectively adding only new files or existing files has been removed. Media can only be added from monitored folders.
- The seek slider cannot be always shown when playing media. The mouse must be hovered over the progress bar above the playback controls to reveal the seek slider.
- The sort order is not preserved in the library like Windows Media Player 10 as long as the player is open.
- The file list of selected files has been removed from the Advanced Tag Editor.
- Next and Previous buttons to cycle through visualizations have been removed.
- Most Auto Playlists included by default in Windows Media Player 10 have been removed.
- Library options to configure what action to take when double clicking files (Add to List, Play All, Play Selected Items) have been removed.
- The total playlist time is no longer shown in the Now Playing list or in the Library without selecting items. It is only shown in the Library for selected items.
- Total number of tracks is also only shown after selecting all tracks. The total size in MB is not shown in any view.
- The expandable tree view was removed from the navigation pane/left side of the media library.
- The Quick Access Panel, located next to the "Now Playing" tab in Windows Media Player 10 which enabled browsing the library via a pop-up/dropdown menu, has been removed. As an example of this, the library cannot be browsed through a menu and without having to switch to library view.
- It is not possible to change the media player's background to black. Instead, the background is a near-white shade of the color chosen in the color chooser.
- In previous versions of Windows Media Player, the keyboard shortcut "Ctrl + I" could be used to capture the frame of video being displayed at the time the shortcut was initiated. This feature was removed for Windows Media Player 11.
- The License Management tool available in prior versions of Windows Media Player has been removed since version 11. It is not possible to back up and restore licenses. This prevents users of music download services from directly using Windows Media Player to back up their licenses and restore them to another computer. The user now must depend on the download service being able to assist with re-acquiring that license. Not all services support this so in some circumstances the user could lose the ability to play media which they've purchased for use with Windows Media Player 11 (e.g. Walmart states: "Important Note: In many cases, we cannot replace song and license files if they are lost. We strongly suggest you back up your music by creating an audio CD or CDs using Windows Media Player 11").
- Windows Media Player 10, which is downloadable for Windows XP and part of Windows XP Media Center Edition 2005 includes the Fraunhofer MP3 ACM codec for ripping to MP3 format. Because of licensing restrictions, Windows Media Player 11 includes only an MP3 decoder, not an ACM encoder.
- The HighMAT burning capability integrated into Windows Media Player 10 is not available in Windows Media Player 11.
- Display Anchor window when in skin mode option has been removed.
- Enable picture support for devices option has been removed.
- The 9SeriesDefault, Atomic, Bluesky, Canvas, Classic, Compact, goo, Headspace, heart, iconic, Miniplayer, Optic, Pyrite, QuickSilver, Radio, Roundlet, Rusty, splat, Toothy, Windows Classic, and Windows XP skins has been removed.
- The Ambience, Particle, Plenoptic, Spikes, and Musical Colors visualizations have been removed.
- The options to use the legacy renderer, overlay mixer, video mixing renderer (VMR-7) or high quality mode (VMR-9) are not available in the Windows Vista version of Windows Media Player 11. The Windows Vista version can use only the Enhanced Video Renderer (EVR).
- Support for live scrubbing or live seeking, that is, the ability to show the video frame after seeking with the mouse or after clicking with the mouse while paused is not available in the version of Windows Media Player 11 in Windows Vista and later but is supported in Windows Media Player 11 on Windows XP.
- The configuration tab to associate with media file types has also been removed from Windows Media Player 11 options in Windows Vista.
- The ability to remove or reinstall Windows Media Player 11 is not present as it is integrated with the operating system. The only exceptions are the "N" editions of Windows Vista, which do not come with Windows Media Player preinstalled.
- Windows Media Player 6.4 (mplayer2.exe) has been removed like with Windows XP Media Center Edition 2005. The MCI version of Media Player (mplay32.exe) has also been removed.

== DirectX features ==
- Since Windows Vista features a rewritten audio stack and does not inherit the Hardware Abstraction Layer for audio that was present under prior versions of Windows, there is no hardware acceleration of DirectSound and DirectSound3D APIs. DirectSound and DirectMusic are emulated entirely in software. As a result, hardware accelerated audio and 3D spatialization in games utilizing DirectSound3D is no longer supported.
- Direct3D Retained Mode (D3DRM) has been removed.
- DirectPlay was removed.
  - Furthermore, DirectPlay Voice and DirectPlay's NAT Helper have been removed.
- Some DirectInput functionality (action-mapper UI) has been removed as well.
- The DirectMusic kernel mode synthesizer that supplies the DirectMusic components with a high-resolution timer has been removed.
- Support for the DirectX 7 and DirectX 8 interfaces for Visual Basic 6.0 was removed in Windows Vista.

== Media features ==
- Windows XP Media Center Edition 2005 digital media components such as Windows Audio Converter, Windows Dancer, Windows CD Label Maker, Party Mode, Plus! screensavers and Windows Media Player skins and visualizations have been removed.
- Video content support is removed from Windows Image Acquisition for Windows Vista in favor of the newer Windows Portable Devices API. As a result, the Windows Vista version of Windows Movie Maker or other analog video capture software which used WIA no longer supports importing, streaming or capturing analog video over USB or FireWire from such an analog video source as a VCR, an analog camcorder or from a Web camera. Windows Explorer also does not therefore display a webcam preview. Microsoft recommends using DirectShow-based software to capture or stream video from such sources.
- Legacy Video for Windows and ACM codecs such as Microsoft H.261, H.263, ACELP.net and G.723.1 were removed. Indeo Video is deactivated by default.
- The Device Manager no longer allows showing and configuring properties for VCM and ACM codecs.
- The Windows Media source filter has been removed resulting in MMS: WMV files being unable to be streamed using GraphEdit or other DirectShow applications.

== Setup and servicing ==
- Windows Vista can no longer be installed on a volume with the FAT file system, although reading and writing FAT data volumes is still supported.
- It is not possible to install hotfixes/updates in unattended mode while displaying the progress bar. Updates can only be installed in silent unattended mode. The /passive switch is not supported.
- Because of setup design changes for faster installation, it is not possible to slipstream service packs or hotfixes into the core operating system files as was possible with Windows XP, Windows Server 2003 and Windows 2000. Microsoft released an updated Windows Vista disc media that integrates Service Pack 1. However, the updated media is available only to certain enterprise customers, MSDN subscribers and new customers who buy the operating system after the release of SP1; it is not available to pre-SP1 end-users of Windows Vista. As an alternative, Windows Automated Installation Kit (WAIK) can be used to alter the image.
- Because of setup design changes, it is not possible to perform an in-place repair reinstall of Windows Vista and later over an existing installation of Windows Vista or later. Any existing data is moved to Windows.old, Users.old folders and previously installed programs need to be reinstalled.
- Windows Vista uses Package Manager (Pkgmgr.exe) and Windows Update Standalone Installer (Wusa.exe) to install software updates and hotfixes. However, these do not support the various command-line switches like Windows XP's Package Installer (Update.exe) did. Much of the functionality from Update.exe is missing. For example, there is no way to skip backing up uninstall information for hotfixes using the /nobackup or /n switch. As Windows Vista performs no cleanup of operating system files in %Windir%\WinSxS for superseded updates, this folder's disk usage can increase considerably over time.
- There is no longer a progress bar shown for each individual downloaded update in the Windows Update UI. There is only a total progress bar. Windows Update also no longer shows a detailed progress of how many megabytes or kilobytes of the updates have been downloaded; it only shows a total size and a percentage of progress completion.

== File system, drivers, memory and hardware ==
- Windows Task Manager no longer shows the peak commit charge. It only shows current commit charge and the maximum limit.
- The driver-signing policy post installation is always set to Warn, eliminating the Ignore and Block options that were available in Windows Server 2003, Windows XP, and Windows 2000.
- For Plug-and-play hardware which is plugged in after Windows Vista is installed, it is not possible to choose from a list of available staged or on-disk device drivers in the Found new hardware wizard which starts automatically. The Found new hardware wizard automatically searches for the driver and fails if it does not find a driver in the driver store or Windows Update. Only the Update Driver wizard which can be invoked from Device Manager then allows manually choosing a driver from a list.
- Windows Management Instrumentation Driver Extensions to WDM are no longer supported.
- Unsigned 64-bit kernel-mode device drivers can no longer be installed.
- Advanced settings for PS/2 mice such as sample rate, input buffer length and fast initialization are not available in Mouse properties in Device Manager.
- Offline Files (Client Side Caching) has been completely rewritten for Vista, dropping backward compatibility of registry configurability XP supported as described in KB811660, dropping API support for various support tools such as CscCmd.exe and CacheMov.exe in the process. Furthermore, if the cache is encrypted (per the default setting), then multiple users of a machine can no longer make the same file available offline, as the cache is now encrypted by user-specific EFS.
- Offline Files cannot be set to automatically synchronize at logoff. This was removed for performance reasons.
- Administrator-level access and a reboot are now required to point files pinned in the Offline Files cache to a new location following any change in the UNC path to a network share.
- USB devices no longer turn off their indicator light after being safely removed with the icon from the notification area. The USB port to which a device is attached but safely removed still remains powered.

== Boot, shutdown, power management ==
- The Low Battery Action cannot be set to run an external program any more.
- Although the Low Battery Alarm and Critical Battery Alarm sounds were updated in Windows Vista, the operating system's battery meter only displays an onscreen notification when a battery's energy reaches a low or critical level; the use of these sounds is reserved for third-party battery meter applications. Microsoft states that this is by design.
- Detailed battery information, such as the battery name, unique ID number, chemistry type, and manufacturer information has been removed from Power Options.
- There is no longer a built-in graphical user interface to configure boot options. The command-line tool, BCDEdit.exe has to be used.
- The Startup Hardware Profiles feature in System Properties has been removed.
- Unlike previous versions of Windows, Windows Vista does not display a progress indicator during hibernation. Microsoft states that this is by design. Windows Vista does display a progress indicator after resuming from hibernation, but it is an indeterminate progress bar instead of a determinate progress bar used in previous versions of Windows.
- Although it is possible to customize the action Windows takes when the hardware Power button is pressed, it is no longer possible to set power options to ask the user every time what action to take upon pressing it. Therefore, selecting a different power action in each case is not possible.
- The Shutdown menu has been removed from Windows Task Manager, not from the Start menu.
- The Shutdown.exe command line tool no longer displays a real-time countdown timer when the system is set to a timed shutdown or restart.
- The shutdown command-line tool limits the delay option (-t) to 600 seconds (10 minutes).
- The uninterruptible power supply (UPS) service which monitors a UPS connected through a COM port is no longer available.

== Windows applications and features ==
System Restore

- System Restore no longer supports configuring its settings through the registry.
- The GUI to configure the disk space utilized for System Restore points is not available in Windows Vista.
- File types and directories can no longer be included or excluded from monitoring by System Restore by editing %windir%\system32\restore\Filelist.xml as was possible in Windows XP. This file no longer exists in Windows Vista.

Backup

- Unlike NTBackup, it is not possible to include or exclude specific files or folders during a backup using the Windows Vista backup application. Only categories of file types can be archived. Because of this, it is not possible to backup files located in a specific path or a network location(s).
- The backup application in Windows Vista does not support the use of tape drives to back up data.
- In the RTM release of Windows Vista, files encrypted using the Encrypting File System (EFS) were not archived by the operating system's backup application; this feature was reinstated in Service Pack 1.
- Windows Vista Backup does not have all the features and command line parameters supported by NTBackup. It also does not support the NTFS archive bit and granular restores.

Diagnostics and maintenance

- The Disk Cleanup handler to compress old files has been removed.
- The graphical representation and progress indicator of the defragmentation process or its analysis have been removed from Windows Disk Defragmenter. It is no longer possible to pause the defragmentation process. Moreover, in the RTM release of Windows Vista, it is not possible to select individual drives to defragment without using the defrag.exe command line utility; Service Pack 1 removes this limitation.
- Disk Defragmenter no longer provides an analysis report with volume information such as the volume's file system, storage capacity, remaining free space and percentage, cluster size, and number of contiguous files. However, this information can still be accessed from the defrag.exe command line utility.
- The Dr. Watson application debugger and crash analysis tool has been removed. It is intended to be replaced by the Problem Reports and Solutions control panel. However, its functionality is different.
- The DirectX Diagnostic tool (DxDiag) only shows information; it is no longer possible to test the hardware and the various DirectX components.
- Certain command line switches for System Information (MSInfo32) are not supported.

Group Policy

- Several Group Policies that were applicable to various Windows XP components no longer apply to equivalent Windows Vista or later OS components due to design change. Therefore, a lot of customizability and functionality made possible by many Group Policies on XP is lost on Windows Vista and later.
- The Resultant Set of Policy snap-in no longer shows the full set of configured Group Policy settings. The command line tool, gpresult.exe has to be used to view all settings.

Connectivity

- Because of Session 0 isolation, the console session has been removed from RDP server and corresponding /console switch removed from the RDP client.
- The following MDAC/Windows Data Access Components have been deprecated: 16-bit ODBC, Jet Database Engine and its Replication Objects (JRO), Remote Data Services (RDS), AppleTalk and Banyan Vines SQL Network Libraries, OLE DB Simple Provider (MSDAOSP), ODBC Setup, ODBC Cursor Engine and OLE DB Interface Remoting.

Windows Fax and Scan

- The Faxing components (Fax Console and Fax wizards) have been removed. Windows Fax and Scan is their replacement, however it is only included in Windows Vista Business, Enterprise and Ultimate editions.
- Unlike Windows XP Fax, Windows Fax and Scan in Windows Vista and later does not support the V.34bis standard which allows higher fax transfer speeds.
- Windows Fax and Scan does not support TWAIN scanners. It only supports WIA scanners.
- Windows Fax and Scan does not support copy/paste, drag and drop or import/export of previous faxes like Windows XP's Fax Console did.
- Windows Fax and Scan does not allow specifying the fax recipient's name if it is not added as a contact in Windows Contacts.

E-mail and contacts

- Block sender is not available in Windows Mail for newsgroups; it is only available for e-mail.
- The ability to send email as plain text (without HTML) only to a specific contact is not available in Windows Contacts.
- It is not possible to share Microsoft Office Outlook contacts with Windows Contacts, whereas in Windows XP, configuring the "UseOutlook" value in the registry allowed sharing Outlook contacts with the Windows Address Book.

Imaging

- The wizard for transferring photos from the camera had some of its functionality removed in Windows Photo Gallery such as the ability to choose which images to transfer from the camera; users had to copy all images even if they had been previously downloaded. However, the previous behavior with options to choose and automatically organize photos into folders is available in Windows Live Photo Gallery. Also, users can still manually copy specific images from the camera by exploring the connected camera from Windows Explorer.
- Selective pages of multi-page TIFF files cannot be printed from Windows Photo Gallery; all pages are printed.
- TIFF annotations cannot be edited or created in Windows Photo Gallery or Windows Live Photo Gallery.
- Support for animated .GIF files has been removed in Windows Photo Gallery which replaced the Windows Picture and Fax Viewer. Only the first frame of the GIF animation is shown in Windows Photo Gallery. Animated GIF files still display properly in Internet Explorer. Support for WMF and EMF formats has also been removed from Windows Photo Gallery.

Microsoft Agent

- Microsoft Agent character preview is not supported in the Agent Character file's property sheet.
- Microsoft Agent no longer supports multiple languages per edition of Windows. The Agent language will always be the same as the language of the Windows edition.
- Due to Microsoft Agent using SAPI 5 for Agent characters instead of SAPI 4, pitch and speed settings of the characters are broken/ignored unless new SAPI 5 compatible XML tags are used.

Help and Support

- Help and Support content does not have an index.
- Help and Support no longer supports dual pane navigation.
- Favorites, History and advanced search options from the Windows XP Help and Support Center are not available in Windows Vista Help. It is not possible to share and install help content to and from other Windows computers or to install or switch to help for other operating systems.
- Built-in support for the 32-bit .HLP (WinHelp) help format has been removed to discourage software developers from using the obsolete format and encourage use of newer 32-bit help formats such as Compiled HTML Help. When starting an application which uses the 32-bit .HLP format, Windows will display a warning saying that the format is no longer supported. The viewer for viewing .HLP files is available from the Microsoft Download Center, but some features present in previous versions are disabled. Support for the 16-bit .HLP format remains.
- Context-sensitive help is not available in Windows Vista, since it was dependent on WinHelp. Although the HTML Help technology also supports context-sensitive help (including "What's this" help), Windows Vista dialogs remove the "What's This" button and context sensitive and the "What's This" help functionality.

Other features

- The ScriptPW.Password COM automation object to mask passwords from the command line is removed.
- Sound Recorder in Windows Vista can no longer open audio files. Moreover, it cannot save in lossless (uncompressed) WAV format when run without using any switches; instead, it saves in lossy 96 kbit/s WMA format. Only the version of Sound Recorder from the N editions of Windows Vista saves audio in WAV format by default. Also, all the basic audio processing features such as format conversion, sample rate conversion, adding echo, reversing the audio, changing volume and playback speed, splitting, inserting and mixing audio have been removed. The graphical viewing of the sound wave spectrum has been replaced with a level meter.
- Support for Microsoft Office Word documents (*.DOC) has been removed from WordPad, partial support for the newer Office Open XML-based DOCX format with limited features was added later in Windows 7 and later versions. Microsoft recommends the freely downloadable Word Viewer for viewing these documents.
- The Unicode IME has been removed. It is included again in Windows 7.
- ClipBook Viewer is not included.
- Internet Backgammon, Internet Hearts (not to be confused with Hearts), Internet Reversi, Internet Spades, and Internet Checkers have been removed. Although freely playable online on MSN Games, they now require signing into a Windows Live ID. Internet Backgammon, Spades and Checkers returned in Windows 7, and were later removed again in Windows 8 due to UEFI support being initial in Windows 8 and later versions. Pinball has also been removed.
- SerialKeys, an accessibility feature for augmentative communicative devices, is no longer supported.
- Many of the screensavers introduced in earlier versions of Windows are not included with Windows Vista.
  - Specifically, the screensavers, '3D FlowerBox', '3D Flying Objects', '3D Pipes', 'Beziers', 'Marquee', 'Mystify' and 'Starfield' were removed from Windows Vista.
  - The My Pictures Slideshow screensaver was replaced by the Photos screensaver.
  - A different screensaver named 'Mystify' (not to be confused with the previous 'Mystify' screensaver) was added in Windows Vista.

== Networking ==
- The SMB 2 protocol unlike SMBv1 does not support determining if a file on a remote volume is a hard link or not.
- There is no longer a notification area icon for Ethernet connections and quick access to enable/disable/repair them, or view their status and properties.
- Windows Vista no longer automatically creates shortcuts to previously visited network shares in the Network Explorer which replaces My Network Places.
- There is no balloon notification when a new connection is connected or when the wired or wireless adapters have limited or no connectivity.
- IPsec tunneling when the computer is behind an NAT device is no longer possible.
- The Wireless Provisioning Services feature to automatically configure wireless hotspots by downloading XML files supplied by Wireless Internet Service Providers (WISPs) is not supported.
- Audio (voice) sessions and sending invitations via mailto: are not supported in Windows Remote Assistance.
- The 1-click "Repair" function to perform a series of steps that quickly reset the network connection has been replaced by the Network Diagnostics feature which attempts to perform troubleshooting and offer suggestions.
- The Web Folders client is not included by default in any version in favor of the WebDAV mini-redirector. It is not available for 64-bit versions.
- UPnP IGD devices do not show up in Network Connections or in the notification area. Status information and statistics of the connection through the internet gateway is not available as could be viewed in Windows XP. NAT port mappings can be set up from the gateway device's Properties -> Settings in Network Explorer.
- The Network Setup Wizard and the Wireless Network Setup Wizard have been removed.
- Windows Vista uses the strong host model for networking, instead of the weak host model used by all previous Windows versions. A weak host model can accept locally destined unicast packets from any network and transfer them to other interfaces on that network. In a multihomed network setup, a strong host model can considerably limit connectivity although it improves security against multihome-based network attacks.
- A single icon in the notification area (system tray) represents network connectivity through all network adapters and/or internet gateways, whether wired or wireless and for all different types of connections. It is not possible to set individual connection status icons on the taskbar or hide some or all network icons altogether.
- The ability to connect automatically to available non-preferred wireless networks in range and to wireless ad hoc networks has been removed due to security reasons. It is also not possible to save the network profile of an ad hoc wireless connection if the connection has been created/initiated by another computer.
- Changing the KeepRasConnections registry key to remain connected after logging off from a RAS client is not supported in Windows Vista.
- The Direct cable connection feature is not supported in Windows Vista.
- Unlike Outlook Express, Windows Mail does not have support for HTTP mail via the WebDAV protocol (used by older Hotmail accounts and Yahoo! Mail); Windows Live Mail however supports WebDAV.
- Unlike Outlook Express, Windows Mail does not allow users to switch Identities or manage multiple identities within one running instance of the program. Instead, identities are now tied to the user account and to create additional users or identities, a new user account has to be created.
- Simple Mail Transfer Protocol (SMTP) and POP3 servers have been removed from the IIS component in Windows Vista.
- rexec, rsh, finger, and some other command-line tools primarily used to communicate with UNIX-based systems have been removed from the default installation. The Subsystem for Unix-based applications (SUA) (previously known as Windows Services for Unix) still provides them as an optional component.
- Windows Messenger has been removed in favor of a link to Windows Live Messenger. Windows Messenger support has also been dropped from Windows Media Center.
- TAPI 3.1 Rendezvous IP Telephony Conferencing API for multicast conferences is not available.
- The RTC Client API 1.3 is not included in Windows Vista.
- Support for built-in H.323 Voice Over IP (VOIP) capabilities has been removed. NetMeeting, H.323 and IP Multicast Conference TSPs and MSPs, and HyperTerminal all are no longer included. Windows Meeting Space is the replacement for NetMeeting; however, features like microphone support, and ability to set up audio or video conferences, are now removed.
- Call answering, connecting to an internet directory, video call and H.323/conference call features have been removed from Phone Dialer.
- IP over 1394 (FireWire networking) support has been removed.
- The basic firewall/filtering functionality and static IP filter APIs in Routing and Remote Access are not available. The three layers of filtering, TCP/IP port filtering, Windows Firewall and IPsec are replaced with a single layer, the Windows Filtering Platform.
- NetDDE, a technology that allows applications using the DDE transport to transparently exchange data over a network, is completely removed from the installation media. Windows Chat (WinChat) which used NetDDE has also been removed.

Legacy networking components

- The Gopher protocol is no longer supported.
- The Windows Messenger and Alerter services are no longer available.
- Rarely used protocols such as Bandwidth Allocation Protocol and X.25 support for SLIP have been removed. SLIP connections are automatically upgraded to use PPP.
- The SPAP, EAP-MD5-CHAP, and MS-CHAP v1 protocols are no longer supported for PPP-based connections, in favor of MS-CHAP v2.
- The NWLink IPX/SPX/NetBIOS Compatible Transport Protocol is no longer supported.
- Asynchronous Transfer Mode (ATM) has been removed.
- The NetBEUI protocol has been completely removed from the installation media.
- The NT LAN Manager Security Support Provider service has been removed in favor of the newer Kerberos authentication protocol.

== Legacy features and other changes ==
- Object Packager, a legacy tool for packaging non-OLE objects and embedding/linking them inside OLE objects, is not included; however, objects can still be inserted in OLE applications such as WordPad.
- Program Manager has been removed altogether. Previously, in Windows XP Service Pack 2, running the executable did not launch it (it just acts as a compatibility stub to Windows Explorer), but it contained several old icons dating back to Windows 3.1.
- The Web Publishing Wizard is no longer available.
- The Desktop Cleanup Wizard is no longer available.
- The Windows Classic theme colors (Brick, Eggplant, Rainy Day, Wheat, Pumpkin, etc.) have been removed.
- The graphical world map has been removed from the Time Zone tab on Date and Time control panel setting in Windows Vista.
- The ability to install service packs cumulatively is no longer available in Windows Vista Service Pack 2 as it requires at least Service Pack 1 to be installed first. Cumulative slipstreaming, however, is possible and supported, however the Component Based Servicing introduced in Windows Vista is a form of layered servicing, meaning when files are updated or slipstreamed, the component is updated but the older files are not removed., leading to increased size of the installation image and increased disk footprint of the installed copy of Windows. In Windows XP and earlier, updated files via slipstreaming directly replaced the original files. This problem of being unable to re-base the OS to a particular service pack or update, affecting Windows Vista and Windows 7 was finally alleviated in Windows 8's DISM with the /ResetBase feature.
- Motherboard BIOS support for Advanced Configuration and Power Interface (ACPI) is required for Windows Vista; as a result, older motherboards supporting only Advanced Power Management do not work as support for the following HALs has been dropped: "Standard PC", "MPS Uniprocessor PC" and "MPS Multiprocessor PC".
- ACPI 2.0 or later is preferred, as Windows Vista's support of technologies like AMD's Cool'n'Quiet power-saving technology is disabled on ACPI 1.0 enabled motherboards.
- Other "legacy" hardware technologies no longer supported include: EISA buses, game ports, MPU-401, AMD K6/2+ Mobile Processors, Mobile Pentium II and Mobile Pentium III SpeedStep, and COM-port based UPSes; ISAPnP is disabled by default.

== See also ==
- Windows Server 2008
- New features by Windows version:
  - XP
  - Vista
  - 7
  - 8
  - 10
  - 11
- Removed features by Windows version:
  - XP
  - Vista
  - 7
  - 8
  - 10
  - 11
