= ThreatLocker =

Cybersecurity software company

- Industry: Cybersecurity
- Founded: 2017
- Founder: Danny Jenkins; Sami Jenkins; John Carolan
- Headquarters: Orlando, Florida, United States
- Key people: Danny Jenkins (CEO); Sami Jenkins (COO); Michael Jenkins (CTO); Rob Allen (CPO)
- Revenue: 100,000,000 United States dollar (2025)
- Number of employees: 700

ThreatLocker is an American cybersecurity company that develops zero trust cybersecurity tools for endpoints and networks, including software as a service products.

== History ==
ThreatLocker was founded in 2017 in Orlando, Florida, United States by Irish entrepreneurs Danny and Sami Jenkins and John Carolan. It initially described its products as providing application whitelisting. With the hiring of Michael Jenkins as chief technology officer in 2019, ThreatLocker shifted towards developing its signature zero trust platform.

In 2021, the company expanded into Europe, raising $20 million for expanding its global footprint and product research and development. By 2022, ThreatLocker had raised a total of $100 million and began providing server and endpoint security for 23,000 organizations. The company was subsequently listed among Orlando Business Journal's 2022 Fire Awards honorees and received a 2022 Fire Awards Blazers. That year, ThreatLocker acquired Third Wall, which made an automated security plug-in that locks down Windows.

In 2023, ThreatLocker opened its Dublin headquarters with approximately 120 positions, and acquired the assets of Arlington, Virginia-based software firm HyperQube Technologies, appointing its chief executive officer Craig Stevenson as director of ThreatLocker Ops. In November of that year, ThreatLocker hired Apple security consultant Viacheslav Konstantinov as chief architect of Mac security and development. A Series D funding round raised $115 million in 2024. Danny Jenkins stated in 2025 that the company was planning an initial public offering within two to three years. The company subsequently completed a Series E funding round in spring of that year, raising approximately $60 million.

ThreatLocker added zero trust network and cloud access products in 2026. This followed the establishment of 14 data centers, 12 of which are based in the United States. The company announced $190 million in Series F funding in July 2026.

== Operations ==
Co-founders Danny and Sami Jenkins are the company's chief executive officer and chief operating officer, respectively. ThreatLocker is based in Orlando, Florida, has European headquarters in Blanchardstown, Dublin, and has offices in the United Arab Emirates and Australia. Its Florida location employs approximately 600 people and there are an additional 100 outside the area, as of 2025. According to an official statement, the company had $100 million in revenue, and that revenue had increased 3,000% over a three-year period. It served approximately 50,000 companies as of 2025. Investors include Boston, Massachusetts-based company Elephant VC and Minneapolis, Minnesota-based company Arthur Ventures.

== Products and services ==
ThreatLocker develops cybersecurity tools for networks, endpoints, and cloud systems, including enterprise-level cybersecurity tools for businesses. Their goal is to help businesses control what software can run in their environments and its capabilities.

It uses a zero trust approach, whereby the software only allows specific applications and user activity that have been approved rather than detecting and blocking it. ThreatLocker offerings include allowlisting, ringfencing, network access control, storage control, elevation control, and threat detection. The company expanded in 2026 with zero trust network and cloud access products for customers including managed service providers.

A 2025 TechRadar review of ThreatLocker's endpoint security product said that while it has an "unrefined UI", it is "quick and simple to deploy, and works great". Competitors include SentinelOne, CrowdStrike, Symantec Endpoint Protection, and Microsoft Defender for Endpoint.
