= List of features removed in Windows XP =

As the next version of Windows NT after Windows 2000, as well as the successor to Windows Me, Windows XP introduced many new features but it also removed some others.

== Shell ==
- The dialog box that warns the users when removing external flash storage devices without safe unmounting has been removed.
- The Line Up Icons command on the desktop was removed and replaced by the Align to Grid option. Due to this being a toggle, simply aligning desktop icons once without further constraining their placement requires an extra click.
- The Minimize all windows command on the taskbar was removed. The purported replacement, Show the desktop, co-existed with this feature on Windows 2000 and in any case only hides windows temporarily instead of actually minimizing them. It is still accessible through the ⊞ Win+M keyboard shortcut but it is not available through the mouse.
- The Show icons using all possible colors (which was previously introduced in Microsoft Plus! for Windows 95 and Windows NT 4.0) option in Display Properties has been removed. Icons are always shown using all possible colors. Microsoft states that this is by design.
- The VGA screen resolution and 8-bit color depth options have been removed from the Settings tab of Display Properties. It is still possible to select these options using the Advanced button available under this tab, however Microsoft states that this workaround is unsupported.
- In the Command Prompt, QuickEdit mode and Insert mode are disabled by default.
- Links to Phone Dialer and NetMeeting were removed from the Start menu.
- The View my Active Desktop as a web page option in the Web tab was removed.

== Boot ==
- All references to Windows 2000 on the boot loader were changed to simply say "Windows".
- The "Starting Windows..." message and its associated text before the boot screen (which was present in Windows 2000) has been removed. The "Resuming Windows..." message and its associated text when the computer is turned on after hibernation remains, but with "Windows 2000" being replaced with "Windows" (see above).
- The layout of the boot screen was changed. Aside from the logo itself, the background is now black instead of white, the progress bar was changed from a determinate progress bar seen in Windows 2000 to an indeterminate one, the animated gradient bar as shown on the boot screens of Windows 95, 98, Me and Windows 2000 was removed, and the "Starting up…" and "Built on NT Technology" texts from Windows 2000's boot screen was removed.
  - For the same reason, the layout of the AUTOCHK-style boot screen (which can be accessed via the /SOS switch in boot.ini) was also changed. In particular, the color scheme was changed, and the progress bar and the animated gradient bar seen on the boot screen was removed.
- The "Built on NT Technology" text on the classic login screen (as present in Windows 2000) was removed.

== Personalization ==
- With the Desktop Themes utility in 2000 becoming the Themes tab in Display Properties in XP, the Rotate theme monthly option in Desktop Themes, which was introduced in Microsoft Plus! 98 and later included in Windows 2000 and Me, and both the options to select what parts of a theme to apply and the previews for parts of a theme were removed.
  - As well, the previous desktop themes introduced with Microsoft Plus! for Windows 95 and included with Windows 98 and Windows Me such as the Baseball, Dangerous Creatures, Inside your Computer, Jungle, Leonardo da Vinci, More Windows, Mystery, Nature, Science, Space, Sports, The 60's USA, The Golden Era, Travel, Underwater, and Windows 98 (Windows Millennium) themes were removed, while Windows Default is replaced by Windows XP and Windows Classic.
- The previous wallpapers and tiles from Windows 95–98, Windows Me, Windows NT 4.0 and Windows 2000 including the Plus! wallpaper were removed.
- The Channel Screen Saver and Plus!-themed screensavers were removed.
- The Utopia sound scheme, first included in Windows 95 and included up to Windows Me, was removed, however the files for the sound scheme remained intact on the Windows XP CD-ROM in the i386 folder and could be manually installed on Windows XP from the CD-ROM; they would be removed from the installation media in the lead-up to Service Pack 3 of Windows XP.
- The Windows Logon Sound and Windows Logoff Sound sounds introduced in Windows 2000 (which served as the startup and shutdown sounds for the OS respectively) were replaced with the ones used by Windows XP (under the names Windows XP Startup and Windows XP Shutdown respectively) while The Microsoft Sound was removed entirely.
- It is no longer possible to save or delete schemes under the Appearance tab of Display Properties.
- The option to select a Pattern under the Background (9x/NT)/Desktop (XP) tab of Display Properties was removed. Users can only set a pattern by editing the registry.
- The 3D FlowerBox, 3D Flying Objects, 3D Pipes and 3D Text screensavers were updated to use Direct3D instead of OpenGL. Because of this, several changes were made:
  - The 3D Flying Objects screensaver was updated to use the new logo introduced with Windows XP while introducing a new default bitmap for the "Textured Flag" option, featuring a graphic with the word "experience".
  - The 3D Pipes teapot easter egg was removed.
  - The 3D Text "volcano" easter egg was removed.
- The 3D Maze and Flying Windows screensavers were removed entirely, likely due to the fact that they were never updated to accommodate the change to the logo introduced with Windows XP.

== Windows Explorer ==
- Small Icons view was removed from Windows Explorer.
- Web view in folders was disabled by default but can be reinstated by editing the registry. Additionally, the Customize This Folder Wizard was removed. Due to the removal of Web view, pie charts showing disk space are no longer available immediately upon opening a drive.
- The status bar no longer shows the free space remaining on the given disk when browsing through folder paths of shell namespace extensions, removable drives, and network shares when the navigation pane (Folders) in Windows Explorer is turned on, unlike in Windows 2000. It continues to show the free space remaining only for paths on local drives. In combination with the Web view-related lack of pie charts previously mentioned, this means it is no longer possible to immediately view the amount of space remaining in these three cases.
- The Directory icon was removed from My Network Places.
- The default sort order in Windows Explorer has changed but can be restored by editing the registry.

== Media components ==
- Deluxe CD Player, which was also first part of Microsoft Plus! 98 before being included in Windows 2000, was removed. Some functionality, including uploading and on-demand (as opposed to automatic) downloading of audio track information and track previewing was not available in the replacement, Windows Media Player.
- DVD Player is no longer usable as it is now a stub that simply opens Windows Media Player. It returned to Windows 10 as an app available from Microsoft Store, which was discontinued again at the end of 2024.
- The WinMe 3D preset in the Musical Colors visualization was replaced with Ice Crystals in Windows Media Player version 8. The name still exists within the files of the visualization. Some of the previous Windows Media Player skins that were in Windows Me was removed entirely. Musical Colors was not included with Windows Media Player version 9 on clean installs of Windows XP starting with Service Pack 2, but is retained if the player is upgraded from version 8 to 9.
- Imaging for Windows was removed. It was replaced by the Windows Picture and Fax Viewer and Scanner and Camera Wizard but these two programs do not include some of its advanced functionality.

== Protocols ==
- NetDDE and NetBEUI, which are included in earlier versions of Windows, are no longer installed by default but can still be manually installed from the Windows XP CD-ROM.
- The DLC network protocol is no longer included. A download was made available by Microsoft.
- The AppleTalk protocol is no longer included and was not made available for download from Microsoft.

== Subsystems ==
- The Microsoft POSIX subsystem was removed. Windows Services for UNIX is available as a replacement.
- The Microsoft OS/2 subsystem, which supports 16-bit character-based OS/2 applications and emulates OS/2 1.x but not 32-bit or graphical OS/2 applications as used with OS/2 2.x or later, was removed.

== Hardware support ==
- Both graphical and command-line formatting options for floppy disks of capacities other than 1.44 MB were removed.
- Support for non-Plug and Play networking devices, such as modems and NICs, and native support for modems slower than 28.8 kbps was removed.
- Support for serial mouse was removed.
- A number of SCSI host adapters are no longer supported.
- Support for NEC's PC-98 series, the i486 Instruction Set and Silicon Graphics' Visual Workstation 320 and 540 was removed.
- New printer installations are required to use user-mode rendering components.

== Windows 9x ==
- WebTV for Windows was removed.
- DriveSpace was removed in favor of native NTFS compression.
- The NTBackup tool included in Windows XP does not support certain backup formats available for use in the MSBackup tool in Windows 9x.

== Later versions ==
=== Service Pack 2 ===
- The following raw socket functionality was removed: sending TCP network packets, sending UDP packets with invalid source network addresses, and associating local addresses.
- Support for TCP half-open connections was removed.
- Program Manager was removed and replaced with Windows Explorer. The executable is still present, but it was replaced with a stub that redirects to Explorer.
- Media Bar, which replaced the Radio Toolbar in Internet Explorer 6, was removed.
- Background message compaction was removed from Outlook Express. Outlook Express in Service Pack 2 automatically compacts messages every hundredth time it is run.
- The radio edit of David Byrne's "Like Humans Do", as previously included in the original and Service Pack 1 releases of Windows XP, was removed.
- The Windows Movie Maker Sample File, which was a short video file consisting of clips of a male child riding a tricycle, playing in a playground, and then running in a field, is no longer generated by Windows Movie Maker 2.1 when it is started for the first time, as was the case with Windows Movie Maker 1.1 in the original and Service Pack 1 releases of Windows XP.
- The boot screens for all editions of Windows XP have been unified by Service Pack 2 for Windows XP with a new one that no longer displays the SKU, with the boot screen for Home Edition using a blue progress bar instead of green. The copyright years on the boot screen were also removed.

=== Service Pack 3 ===
- The Address bar toolbar on the taskbar was removed for legal reasons, according to Microsoft. Windows Desktop Search is touted as a replacement.
- The ability to use boot disks to boot into setup was removed.
- The option to display the special Internet Explorer icon on the desktop was removed.
- The ability to install service packs cumulatively is no longer available in Service Pack 3 as it requires at least Service Pack 1 to be installed first (Service Pack 2 in the cases of the original Windows XP Media Center Edition and Windows XP Media Center Edition 2004). Cumulative slipstreaming, however, is still possible and supported.
- The Energy Star logo in the Display Properties dialog, first introduced with Windows 95 and included up to Windows XP Service Pack 2, was removed.
- The copyright information in the About Windows (winver.exe) box was updated from "1985-2001" to "2007". The banner itself remains unchanged, however.

=== Media Center Edition 2005 ===
- Despite this edition being developed from Windows XP Professional, domain support is unavailable. Microsoft states that this is due to Windows Media Center Extenders requiring fast user switching. The exceptions to this are if it is selected during installation or already in use before an upgrade, but leaving the domain will still disable the feature. These changes do not affect older versions of Windows XP Media Center Edition and other editions of Windows XP.
- Windows Media Player 6.4, which was hidden in Windows XP and came shipped with Windows 2000 and can be installed on Windows 95, Windows NT 4.0 and Windows 98, was removed. The MCI version of Media Player, Media Player 5.1, also hidden in Windows XP, remains.

== See also ==
- New features by Windows version:
  - XP
  - Vista
  - 7
  - 8
  - 10
  - 11
- Removed features by Windows version:
  - XP
  - Vista
  - 7
  - 8
  - 10
  - 11
