= Desktop Cleanup Wizard =

- Desktop Cleanup Wizard
- Developer: Microsoft
- Operating system: Microsoft Windows

The Desktop Cleanup Wizard is a component included with Microsoft's Windows XP operating system. It aims to reduce the clutter in a user's desktop environment by moving unused shortcuts to a separate directory called "Unused Desktop Shortcuts". When run it shows a list of shortcuts, and the user can select which shortcuts to move to the "Unused Desktop Shortcuts" directory.

The Desktop Cleanup Wizard works as a scheduled task that runs once a day. If the wizard has not been run for 60 days, the Wizard is displayed to the user. The Desktop Cleanup Wizard is also accessible from the desktop's context menu, in the "Arrange Icons By" sub-menu.

The Desktop Cleanup Wizard scheduled task can be enabled or disabled in the "Desktop Items" configuration screen, which is available through the Desktop tab on the Display Properties dialog box.

Windows XP's successor, Windows Vista, does not include the Desktop Cleanup Wizard. As of Windows 7, its function has been integrated into the System Maintenance Wizard in the Troubleshooting Control Panel.

== See also ==
- Features new to Windows XP
- Features removed from Windows Vista
