= WP7 =

WP7 may mean:

- Windows Phone 7, Microsoft's operating system for mobile phones
- Version 7 of WordPerfect word processing software, and the file extension used for its files
