= Whitelist =

Practice of allowing people or entities, generally

A whitelist or allowlist is a list or register of entities that are being provided a particular privilege, service, mobility, access or recognition. Entities on the list will be accepted, approved and/or recognized. Whitelisting is the reverse of blacklisting, the practice of identifying entities that are denied, unrecognized, or ostracized.

== Email whitelists ==
Spam filters often include the ability to "whitelist" certain sender IP addresses, email addresses or domain names to protect their email from being rejected or sent to a junk mail folder. These can be manually maintained by the user or system administrator - but can also refer to externally maintained whitelist services.

=== Non-commercial whitelists ===
Non-commercial whitelists are operated by various non-profit organizations, ISPs, and others interested in blocking spam. Rather than paying fees, the sender must pass a series of tests; for example, their email server must not be an open relay and have a static IP address. The operator of the whitelist may remove a server from the list if complaints are received.

=== Commercial whitelists ===
Commercial whitelists are a system by which an Internet service provider allows someone to bypass spam filters when sending email messages to its subscribers, in return for a pre-paid fee, either an annual or a per-message fee. A sender can then be more confident that their messages have reached recipients without being blocked, or having links or images stripped out of them, by spam filters. The purpose of commercial whitelists is to allow companies to reliably reach their customers by email.

== Advertising whitelist ==
Many websites rely on ads as a source of revenue, but the use of ad blockers is increasingly common. Websites that detect an adblocker in use often ask for it to be disabled - or their site to be "added to the whitelist" - a standard feature of most adblockers.

== Network whitelists ==
=== LAN whitelists ===
A use for whitelists is in local area network (LAN) security. Many network admins set up MAC address whitelists, or a MAC address filter, to control who is allowed on their networks. This is used when encryption is not a practical solution or in tandem with encryption. However, it's sometimes ineffective because a MAC address can be faked.

=== IP whitelist ===
Firewalls can usually be configured to only allow data-traffic from/to certain (ranges of) IP-addresses.

=== Application whitelists ===
One approach in combating viruses and malware is to whitelist software which is considered safe to run, blocking all others. This is particularly attractive in a corporate environment, where there are typically already restrictions on what software is approved.

Leading providers of application whitelisting technology include Bit9, Velox, McAfee, Lumension, ThreatLocker, Airlock Digital and SMAC.

On Microsoft Windows, recent versions include AppLocker, which allows administrators to control which executable files are denied or allowed to execute. With AppLocker, administrators are able to create rules based on file names, publishers or file location that will allow certain files to execute. Rules can apply to individuals or groups. Policies are used to group users into different enforcement levels. For example, some users can be added to a report-only policy that will allow administrators to understand the impact before moving that user to a higher enforcement level.

Linux systems typically have AppArmor and SE Linux features available which can be used to effectively block all applications which are not explicitly whitelisted, and commercial products are also available.

On HP-UX introduced a feature called "HP-UX Whitelisting" on 11iv3 version.

== Controversy regarding name ==
In 2018, a journal commentary on a report on predatory publishing was released making claims that "white" and "black" are racially charged terms that need to be avoided in instances such as "whitelist" and "blacklist".

The premise of the journal is that "black" and "white" have negative and positive connotations respectively. It states that since "blacklisting" was first referred to during "the time of mass enslavement and forced deportation of Africans to work in European-held colonies in the Americas," the word is therefore related to race. There is no mention of "whitelist" and its origin or relation to race.

This issue is most widely disputed in computing industries where "whitelist" and "blacklist" are prevalent (e.g. IP whitelisting). Despite the commentary nature of the journal, some companies and individuals in others have taken to replacing "whitelist" and "blacklist" with new alternatives such as "allow list" and "deny list". Those adopting this change consider using the "whitelist"/"blacklist" names as a code smell.

Those that oppose these changes question its attribution to race, citing the same etymology quote that the 2018 journal uses. According to the remark, the term "blacklist" evolved from the term "black book" about a century ago. The term "black book" does not appear to have any etymology or sources that support racial associations, instead originating in the 1400s as a reference to "a list of people who had committed crimes or fallen out of favor with leaders", and popularized by King Henry VIII's literal use of a black book. Others also note the prevalence of positive and negative connotations to "white" and "black" in the Bible, predating attributions to skin tone and slavery. It wasn't until the 1960s Black Power movement that "Black" became a widespread word to refer to one's race as a person of color in America (alternate to African-American) lending itself to the argument that the negative connotation behind "black" and "blacklist" both predate attribution to race.

== See also ==
- Blacklisting
- Blacklist (computing)
- Blackballing
- Closed platform
- DNSWL, whitelisting based on DNS
- Opt-in
