= List of features removed in Windows 8 =

Windows 8 is a version of Windows NT and the successor of Windows 7. Several features that originated in earlier versions of Windows and that were included in versions up to Windows 7 are no longer present in Windows 8. The removed features are listed as follows (both original and Windows 8.1).

== Windows Shell ==
- Start button was removed from the taskbar (although it was added again in Windows 8.1). Replacement methods for invoking the Start screen include a hotspot in the lower left corner of the screen, where the Start screen tile pops up, and a Start button among "the charms".
- "Recent documents" menu is removed from Start screen.
- Unified search is removed. A category-specific search replaces the former. It can search "Apps", "Settings", "Files" or within an app-specific index (such as, for example, e-mails from the Mail app) but not all at once. The default category is Apps, but can be changed before or after performing a search. Windows 8.1 restores this feature partially although unified search still does not search keywords or metadata like scoped search.
- Windows Desktop Gadgets, introduced in Windows Vista and included up to Windows 8 build 8432 (fbl_loc), are removed due to security issues associated with the execution of compromised gadgets.
- Windows 2000, NT 4.0, Server 2003, and Server 2008 compatibility modes were removed.
- Internet Explorer no longer shares the same navigation buttons as File Explorer. This can also be seen with IE9 on earlier beta builds of Windows 8, and all later IE versions after 8 on Windows Vista and 7.

== Appearance and personalization ==
- The Aero Glass theme is replaced by a new theme with a flatter visual appearance in line with the Metro design language. This was done to reduce the amount of skeuomorphism in the UI. Aside from the taskbar, the new theme uses fewer transparency effects than the previous Glass theme.
- Flip 3D introduced in Windows Vista and included up to Windows 8 build 8002 (fbl_dnt3_wireless) is removed. ⊞ Win+Tab ↹ now toggles between Windows Store apps and the desktop.
- The Windows Classic theme, first introduced in Windows 95 and included up to Windows 8 build 7785, is removed. High-contrast themes (which previously used the Classic appearance) are modified to use the new visual styles.
- "Advanced appearance settings...", once found in Personalization > Window Color and Appearance part of the Control Panel is removed.
- Sample pictures, sample music clips, sample video clip and preset user account pictures (a form of avatar) are no longer available.
- The sound schemes that were first included with Windows 7: Afternoon, Calligraphy, Characters, Cityscape, Delta, Festival, Garden, Heritage, Landscape, Quirky, Raga, Savanna, and Sonata are all no longer available; only the folders remain in C:\Windows\Media, and they are empty. However, if Windows 8 is directly upgraded from Windows 7 instead of a clean install, the sound schemes and the files relating to the sound schemes that are included in Windows 7 will be retained.

== File Explorer ==
- The Briefcase option under New context menu is removed by default, but can be reinstated by editing the registry.
- Because of the Details pane being moved to the right instead of at the bottom, it can no longer be enabled at the same time as the Preview pane. If the Details pane was turned on permanently, turning on the Preview pane turns it off every time since only one of them can be enabled at a time.

== Games ==
- Chess Titans, FreeCell, Hearts, Mahjong Titans, Minesweeper, Purble Place, Solitaire, and Spider Solitaire, as well as Internet Backgammon, Checkers, and Spades were removed. Updated versions of FreeCell, Mahjong, Minesweeper, Solitaire, and Spider Solitaire were available in Windows Store.
- The Games Explorer was hidden since Windows 8 build 8128. The feature itself and its command line shortcut (shell:games) remained until Windows 10 version 1709. The hidden shell was removed permanently in Windows 10 version 1803.

== Networking ==
- For dial-up networking, some of the options under "Redialing options", such as "Redial attempts" and "Redial if line is dropped", are no longer available. Although dial-up networking using PSTN telephone line is becoming increasingly rare, this could affect users that still use it to connect to 2G, 3G and/or 3.5G mobile networks and also DSL subscribers that use the system's PPPoE dialer.
- The "Manage wireless networks" option on the task pane of the Network and Sharing Center control panel is no longer available, although some of its functionality is still available through the netsh command netsh wlan. Some of this functionality is reintroduced with the Windows 8.1 Update via the PC Settings app. Similarly, creating an ad hoc wireless connection via the "Set up a wireless ad hoc" option under "Set up a new connection or network" is no longer available through the GUI; users need to use the same netsh command or a third-party utility such as Connectify.
- One can no longer save a Wi-Fi connection to a flash drive from the Wireless Network Properties box under the Connection tab.
- Shortcuts for the Bluetooth File Transfer wizard, which are added by Windows 7 on a device with Bluetooth communication, are no longer provided. The utility itself (fsquirt.exe) remains available.
- The Bluetooth stack does not support Bluetooth A2DP sink role, so playing audio from other phones or other PCs using Bluetooth to a PC running Windows 8 is not possible. Windows 7 supported both A2DP source and sink roles.
- Network Map is removed from Network and Sharing Center

== User accounts and security ==
- Windows CardSpace was removed.
- Windows Defender:
  - Can no longer schedule automatic system scans; it is now part of Action Center's maintenance schedule
  - No longer shows the currently processed item

== Media features ==
- Windows Media Center is no longer included with any of Windows 8 editions and is no longer offered as an add-on by Microsoft. It was available until 2015-10-30 as a US$9.99 add-on (and before 2013-01-31 as a promotional free add-on) from Microsoft's now discontinued Windows 8 Feature Packs web site and through the now discontinued Add features to Windows 8 service for Windows 8 Pro (via the Media Center Pack) and Windows 8 core edition (via the Pro Pack).
- DVD-Video and MPEG-2 Video codecs are no longer included. Video DVDs can be played in Windows Media Center for those who acquired that add-on while it was available.
- Windows DVD Maker was removed in favor of third-party software.
- Windows Media Center cannot run on startup or on top of other windows because of "new Windows OS requirements and behaviors".
- Windows Media Player no longer has the Media Guide feature and the DVD tab in the Options menu.
- Windows 2000 Display Driver Model (XDDM), is discontinued in Windows 8.
- MIDI Mapper is removed; programs now need to select a specific MIDI device. No selection means device #0, which is Microsoft GS Wavetable Synth.

== File system ==
- Backup and Restore is deprecated and renamed Windows 7 File Recovery in favor of File History.
- Persistent shadow copies are no longer available. Therefore, the ability to browse, search and/or recover older versions of files via the Previous Versions tab of the Properties dialog of files was removed for local volumes. Configuring and scheduling of previous versions of files was also removed from the System Protection tab of the Advanced System Properties (systempropertiesadvanced.exe) dialog box.
- CHKDSK utility only shows the progress percentage when running at startup.

== Other ==
- Stop errors are simplified; specifically, several paragraphs of generic advice and auxiliary error codes are removed. Windows 8.1 added a registry setting to revert the changes, which is also available to Windows 8 users after installing a hotfix.
- Microsoft Anna's text-to-speech voice introduced in Windows Vista and included up to Windows 8 build 7996 were replaced with three new voices; Microsoft David, Microsoft Hazel, and Microsoft Zira.
- The sounds played upon login, logout, and system shutdown and the sound events themselves were removed. The startup sound remains but is disabled by default.
- .NET Framework 3.5 is no longer installed. Windows requires an Internet connection to install it, although Microsoft has published a workaround that enables users to install it from Windows installation disc.
- .NET Framework 1.1 is not supported.
- Windows 8 only supports IA-32 and x86-64 processors with PAE, SSE2, and NX.
- Features like the IME Pad and the toolbars are removed in Sucheng/Quick, Cangjie and Dayi inputs, but still remain in Bopomofo inputs.
- Drivers for OHCI-compliant FireWire 400 (IEEE 1394-1995) host controllers are removed, although they are available from Microsoft Support. Windows 8.x comes with drivers for FireWire 800 (IEEE 1394b-2002).
- DirectDraw emulation, previously deprecated, now exhibits significant performance degradation in certain legacy games.
- The ability to set the time and date on the out-of-box experience was removed, which was a feature dating back to the beginning of Windows and MS-DOS.

== Features removed in Windows 8.1 ==
- Newly installed programs are no longer added to the Start screen.
- The Performance Information and Tools Control Panel applet introduced in Windows Vista is no longer available.
- File Explorer no longer shows Libraries by default.
- Connect to a Network Projector (netproj.exe) introduced in Windows Vista is deprecated as an optional component.
- Facebook and Flickr support was removed from the Photos app.
- Incremental block-based file backup and scheduling backups is removed (however it was reintroduced in Windows 10). Only System Image Backup remains.
- The Windows Experience Index score is removed.

== See also ==
- Windows Server 2012
- Comparison of Start menu replacements for Windows 8
- New features by Windows version:
  - XP
  - Vista
  - 7
  - 8
  - 10
  - 11
- Removed features by Windows version:
  - XP
  - Vista
  - 7
  - 8
  - 10
  - 11
