= Microsoft Messaging =

Instant messaging app by Microsoft

Messaging
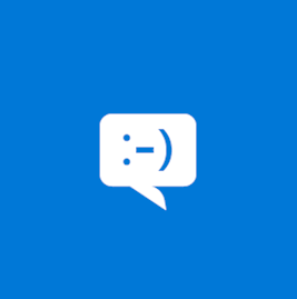
- Developer: Microsoft
- Stable release: March 2025 Update (5.2503.4003.0) / March 2025; 1 year ago
- Operating system: Windows 10 Discontinued: Windows 8, Windows Phone 7, 8 and 8.1, Windows 10 Mobile
- Size: 29.3 MB
- Available in: 65 languages
- List of languages Afrikaans, Albanian, Amharic, Arabic, Azerbaijani, Bangla (Bangladesh), Basque, Belarusian, Bulgarian, Catalan, Chinese (Simplified), Chinese (Traditional), Croatian, Czech, Danish, Dutch, English (United Kingdom), English (United States), Estonian, Filipino, Finnish, French, French (Canada), Galician, German, Greek, Hausa (Latin), Hebrew, Hindi, Hungarian, Icelandic, Indonesian, Italian, Japanese, Kannada, Kazakh, Khmer, Kiswahili, Korean, Lao, Latvian, Lithuanian, Macedonian, Malay, Malayalam, Norwegian (Nynorsk), Persian, Polish, Portuguese (Brazil), Portuguese (Portugal), Romanian, Russian, Serbian (Latin, Serbia), Slovak, Slovenian (Slovenia), Spanish (Mexico), Spanish (Spain), Swedish, Tamil, Telugu, Thai, Turkish, Ukrainian, Uzbek, Vietnamese

Messaging (also known as Microsoft Messaging, and as of recently, Windows Operator Messages) is an instant messaging Universal Windows Platform app for Windows 10.

Its mobile version for Windows 10 Mobile allowed SMS, MMS and RCS messaging. The desktop version is restricted to showing SMS messages sent via Skype, and billing SMS message from an LTE operator.

As of recently, the app was refocused into a SMS data plan app, where your mobile operator sends messages about your data plan, this is due to the functionality of the app switching to Skype. It was also partially renamed to Windows Operator Messages.

Due to Skype closing in May 2025, Windows Operator Messages will stop working as it uses the platform, the fate of the app itself is unknown.
