= Soft Input Panel =

On-screen text input method

The Soft Input Panel (also called S.I.P.) is a special on-screen input method for devices which do not have standard hardware keyboards. SIP is commonly used in Microsoft Pocket PC and Tablet PC devices, where there is no room for a hardware keyboard. In Microsoft Windows there is a similar on-screen keyboard used as a Microsoft Active Accessibility (MSAA) which also has an ability to change its layout according to current keyboard language and key layout. It was patented by Microsoft in November 2004 under the patent number 6819315.

Windows XP on-screen keyboard

Windows Mobile SIP

Windows Mobile SIP with additional characters
