= Sound Recorder (software) =

Audio recording program

- Sound Recorder in Windows 11
- Other names: Voice Recorder
- Developer: Microsoft

Stable release(s) [±]
- Windows 11: May 2026 Update (11.2605.1) / June 30, 2026; 3 days ago
- Windows 10 (discontinued): March 2021 Update (10.2103.28) / April 2, 2025; 15 months ago
- Operating system: Windows 11 Discontinued: Windows 10 (2025)
- Platform: IA-32, x86-64 and ARM (and historically DEC Alpha, Itanium, MIPS, and PowerPC)
- Type: Sound recorder
- Website: support.microsoft.com/en-us/windows/how-to-use-voice-recorder-6fbb53d5-0539-abda-a9a4-0bcb84a778e7

Sound Recorder (known as Voice Recorder in Windows 10) is an audio recording program included in most versions of the Microsoft Windows family of operating systems. Its user interface has been replaced twice in the past.

== History ==
Sound Recorder in Windows 98, displaying features of the original user interface

Sound Recorder in Windows Vista, featuring the first major change in its user interface

Sound Recorder has been in most versions and editions of Windows since Windows 3.0, including Windows 9x, Windows Server and the client versions of Windows NT. Even Windows Mobile came with one. Its user interface and feature set saw very little change until Windows Vista, when features that lacked practicality were discontinued and Sound Recorder was simplified. This version of Sound Recorder was included in Windows 7, Windows 8 and Windows 8.1, but did not make it to Windows 10.

A second, different Sound Recorder was introduced in Windows 8.1, thus Windows 8.1 has two distinct apps called Sound Recorder. This second app was a Metro-style app and adhered to the design tenets of the Metro design language. Leaked images of a preview version Windows 10 Mobile showed this app too. When Windows 10 released, however, it was renamed Voice Recorder. The original Sound Recorder was removed from Windows 10.

With the release of Windows 11, Voice Recorder was renamed back to Sound Recorder and included new features, such as changing the playback speed and the input source within the app.

== Features ==
Sound Recorder can record audio from a microphone or headset. In addition, many modern sound cards allow their output channels to be recorded through a loopback channel, typically called "Wave-Out Mix" or "Stereo Mix".

Before Windows Vista, Sound Recorder was capable of:

- Playing the audio files that it has recorded
- Converting the bit rate, bit depth and sampling rate of the audio file
- Inserting other audio files at the beginning, end or the desired location of the current audio
- Splitting out parts of the current audio clip
- Increasing or decreasing volume in 25% increments
- Increase or decrease playback speed in 100% increments
- Adding an echo (without reverberation)
- Reversing the current audio clip

These features, however, were either removed in Windows Vista or taken over by other applications. The playback and trimming features reappeared in Voice Recorder, although Voice Recorder can only play its own recordings.

Sound Recorder accepts command-line parameters. This was removed in Windows 8, as Windows Store apps cannot be run with a parameter from the command-line.

=== File format ===
Before Windows 7, Sound Recorder could save the recorded audio in waveform audio (.wav) container files. Sound Recorder could also open and play existing .wav files. To successfully open compressed .wav files in Sound Recorder, the audio codec used by the file must be installed in the Audio Compression Manager (ACM); Windows installations dating back to at least Windows 95 came with a selection of standard codecs that included Truespeech, GSM 6.10, G.723.1, IMA ADPCM and CCITT A-law and u-law, with additional codecs being added in later editions.

Starting with Windows Vista, Sound Recorder saves recorded audio in Windows Media Audio (.wma) files instead; the exceptions to this are the Home Basic N and Business N editions, which continue to use .wav. Also, audio metadata such as Artist, Album, Title, and Genre can be added to the sound file directly while saving the file.

Voice Recorder in Windows 10 only records audio in MPEG-4 Part 14 (.m4a) container formats.

== Issues ==
Versions of Sound Recorder before Windows Vista recorded audio to memory, rather than to the hard disk, and the length of recording was by default limited to 60 seconds. Microsoft recommends recording 60 seconds and pressing the Record button again to record another minute. In addition, it is possible to use the Sound Recorder's concatenation feature to increase the length of the audio file. For example, saving an initial 1 minute recording as "1min.wav" and then inserting the "1min.wav" file 9 times creates 10 minutes of recording which can then be saved as "10min.wav". This "10min.wav" file can then be suffixed to itself 5 more times (or as many times as there is room in memory) to create a "1hour.wav" file. By recording over any of these longer sound files, Sound Recorder can have an uninterrupted arbitrary recording time (limited only by primary memory).

In 32-bit versions of Windows before Windows Vista, on computers with more than 2 GB of RAM, after recording (but not when playing), Sound Recorder will return an error message indicating that there is not enough memory. This is a design flaw of older versions of Sound Recorder and officially cannot be resolved except by reducing the amount of available physical memory. There does, however, exist an unofficial patch that resolves this problem. Another solution to the 'not enough memory' error is to run the program in compatibility mode. This can be achieved by right clicking on the .exe file, then selecting: properties, compatibility tab, 'run this program in compatibility for', and selecting the appropriate option, such as 'Windows XP Service Pack 2'.

The Sound Recorder in Windows Vista and later uses the hard disk for recording audio and can therefore record audio up to any length as long as there is free space on the hard disk drive.
