= AppLocker =

Application whitelisting software for Windows

AppLocker is an application whitelisting technology introduced with Microsoft's Windows 7 operating system. It allows restricting which programs users can execute based on the program's path, publisher, or hash, and in an enterprise can be configured via Group Policy.

== Summary ==
Windows AppLocker allows administrators to control which executable files are denied or allowed to execute. With AppLocker, administrators are able to create rules based on file names, publishers or file location that will allow certain files to execute. Unlike the earlier Software Restriction Policies, which was originally available for Windows XP and Windows Server 2003, AppLocker rules can apply to individuals or groups. Policies are used to group users into different enforcement levels. For example, some users can be added to an 'audit' policy that will allow administrators to see the rule violations before moving that user to a higher enforcement level.

== AppLocker availability charts ==
AppLocker availability on Windows 7
Starter	Home Basic	Home Premium	Professional	Enterprise	Ultimate
No	No	No	Create policies, but cannot enforce	Create and enforce policies	Create and enforce policies

AppLocker availability on Windows 8
RT	(Core)	Pro	Enterprise
No	No	No	Yes

AppLocker availability on Windows 10
Home	Pro	Enterprise	Education
Yes	Yes	Yes	Yes

== Bypass techniques ==
There are several generic techniques for bypassing AppLocker:

- Writing an unapproved program to a whitelisted location.
- Using a whitelisted program as a delegate to launch an unapproved program.
- Hijacking the DLLs loaded by a trusted application in an untrusted directory.
