= Windowing system =

Software that manages separately different parts of display screens

Typical elements of a window. The window decoration is either drawn by the window manager or by the client. The drawing of the content is the task of the client.

In computing, a windowing system (or window system) is a software suite that manages separately different parts of display screens. It is a type of graphical user interface (GUI) which implements the WIMP (windows, icons, menus, pointer) paradigm for a user interface.

Each currently running application is assigned a usually resizable and usually rectangular surface of the display to present its GUI to the user; these windows may overlap each other, as opposed to a tiling interface where they are not allowed to overlap. Usually a window decoration is drawn around each window. The programming of both the window decoration and of available widgets inside of the window, which are graphical elements for direct user interaction, such as sliders, buttons, etc., is eased and simplified through the use of widget toolkits.

== Technical details ==
The main component of any windowing system is usually called the display server, although alternative terms such as window server are also in use. Any application that runs and presents its GUI in a window, is a client of the display server. The display server and its clients communicate with each other over an application programming interface (API) or a communications protocol, which is usually called display server protocol, the display server being the mediator between the clients and the user. It receives all the input from the kernel, that the kernel receives from all attached input devices, such as keyboard, pointing devices, or touchscreen and transmits it to the correct client. The display server is also responsible for the output of the clients to the computer monitor. The output of sound is usually not managed by the display server, but the sound volume is usually handled through GUI applets and it is the display server who decides which applications are on top. A windowing system enables the computer user to work with several programs at the same time. Each program presents its GUI in its own window, which is generally a rectangular area of the screen.

From a programmer's point of view, a windowing system implements graphical primitives. For example: rendering fonts or drawing a line on the screen. It provides an abstraction of the graphics hardware for use by higher-level elements of the graphical interface such as a window manager.

A display server protocol can be network capable or even network transparent, facilitating the implementation of thin clients.

== Display server ==
The basic components of a GUI: The display server implements the windowing system. A simple window manager merely draws the window decorations, but compositing window managers do more.

A display server or window server is a program whose primary task is to coordinate the input and output of its clients to and from the rest of the operating system, the hardware, and each other. The display server communicates with its clients over the display server protocol, a communications protocol, which can be network-transparent or simply network-capable.

The display server is a key component in any graphical user interface, specifically the windowing system.

The server/client relationship of a standalone display server is somewhat counterintuitive in that a "server" is usually thought of as a large, remote machine, whereas a standalone "display server" is a small local system, with most clients being executed on a larger central machine. The explanation is that a display server provides the services of a display and input devices.

== Display server communications protocols ==
=== X11 ===
The X.Org Server communicates with X clients (local or remote) and peripherals over the X11 protocol.

The X Window System was first released in 1984 and is historically the main windowing system for Unix and Unix-like operating systems. The core protocol has been at version 11 since 1987, hence it commonly being known as "X11". The current reference implementation of the X11 protocol is the X.Org Server, which provides the display server and some ancillary components. The X Window System does not define a look and feel; instead, users run a window manager (either standalone or part of a broader desktop environment) and applications designed using a widget toolkit. The X.Org repository includes a reference window manager, twm; a reference implementation of a widget toolkit, X Athena Widgets; and some basic applications, such as a calculator and clock.

Other notable examples of display servers implementing the X11 display server protocol are XFree86 (from which the current X.Org Server was forked), XQuartz (for macOS) and Cygwin/X (for Microsoft Windows).

=== Wayland ===
The Wayland display server protocol

Display servers that implement the Wayland protocol are called Wayland compositors, communicating with clients over the Wayland protocol. Wayland was created as the intended successor to X11, and differs from X11's design significantly. A Wayland compositor combines the functions of a display server, window manager, and compositing manager into one component, whereas in X11 they are separate pieces of software.

The scope of the Wayland protocol is far smaller than X11's core protocol, defining only how clients write data into buffers called "surfaces", and it does not function as a network protocol. All other functionality is delegated to extension protocols (developed upstream in the wayland-protocols repository), the Direct Rendering Manager and evdev components of the Linux kernel, the Mesa 3D graphics library, widget toolkits (such as GTK, Qt, and EFL), the XDG Desktop Portal system, and various other software packages such as libinput and PipeWire.

Wayland has seen adoption by several open source desktop environments, including GNOME and KDE Plasma which are porting from X11, and environments like COSMIC which were written from scratch as Wayland-native environments. Several standalone compositors such as Weston, Sway, Hyprland, Wayfire, niri, labwc are also available. Wayland has also seen adoption by several embedded and mobile-focused systems, including Tizen, Sailfish OS, and WebOS.

The reference implementation of Wayland is available under the MIT License, consisting of the libwayland-client and libwayland-server libraries.

There is an ongoing effort to add Wayland support to ChromeOS.

=== Mir ===
The Mir display server comes with its own Mir display server protocol which is different from those used by X11 and Wayland. Mir additionally supports the X11 protocol. It was developed by Canonical and was intended to be the display server of choice for Ubuntu. As of 2017, it has been replaced with the Wayland display server for desktop editions of Ubuntu.

There are implementations of the Mir display server, the libmir-server and the libmir-client libraries available under the GPLv3.

== Windowing systems with APIs ==
=== SurfaceFlinger ===
Google developed a display server called SurfaceFlinger for Android:

Everything in Android is rendered to a "surface"; "surfaces" are produced by applications and placed into a queue that is managed by SurfaceFlinger.

Yet another Android-specific solution is "Gralloc". Gralloc handles device memory i.e. it does allocation, arbitration, it handles synchronization via Android/Linux fence file descriptors. Gralloc competes with other solutions like e.g. Mesa's Generic Buffer Management (GBM) or Nvidia's EGLStreams. The Gralloc hardware abstraction layer (HAL) is used to allocate the buffers that underlie "surfaces".

For compositing in Android, Surfaces are sent to SurfaceFlinger, which uses OpenGL ES to do the compositing.

Hardware Composer HAL (HWC) was introduced in Android 3.0 and has evolved steadily over the years. Its primary purpose is to determine the most efficient way to composite buffers with the available hardware. As a HAL, its implementation is device-specific and usually done by the display hardware OEM.

=== Quartz Compositor ===
For Apple's macOS family of operating systems, Quartz Compositor fulfils the tasks of a display server and of a window manager in the windowing system.

=== Desktop Window Manager ===
For Microsoft Windows, from Windows Vista onward, Desktop Window Manager enables the use of hardware acceleration to render the graphical user interface. It was originally created to enable portions of the new "Windows Aero" user experience, which allowed for effects such as transparency, 3D window switching and more. It is also included with Windows Server 2008, but requires the "Desktop Experience" feature and compatible graphics drivers to be installed. From Windows 8 onwards DWM can't be disabled and is software rendered if no suitable graphics card is installed.

== List of windowing systems ==
=== For Unix-like operating systems ===
- 8½ and rio for Plan 9
- fbui (with a modified Linux kernel)
- HP Windows/9000 (on early versions of HP-UX)
- CMU Andrew Window Manager
- Sapphire for the PERQ
- Whitechapel Oriel
- Silicon Graphics MEX
- ManaGeR (MGR)
- Metisse
- Mir
- NeWS / OpenWindows
- NeXT DPS
- Orbital (Redox)
- Qt Extended
- Quartz Compositor (macOS)
- SunView
- Twin (Text WINdows)
- W Window System
- Wayland
- X Window System
- XFast
- Xynth
- Y-Windows

=== For Windows NT-family operating systems ===
- Desktop Window Manager (DWM) in Microsoft Windows (Vista and later)
- ReactOS Explorer
- Classic Shell
- Pokki
- RetroUI

=== Web windowing systems ===
- Dojo
- Ext JS
- TIBCO General Interface

=== Other ===
- DM
- GEM
- Intuition
- Microwindows
- MiniGUI
- OOHG
- Visi On
- VWS (VAX Workstation Software)
- mpx/mux (for the Bell Labs Blit terminal)
- Symbolics Dynamic Windows

Some systems such as Microsoft Windows (XP, 9x and earlier), the classic Mac OS (version 9 and earlier), and Palm OS, contain a windowing system which is integrated with the OS.

== See also ==
- History of the graphical user interface
- List of display servers
