= Features new to Windows 7 =

Overview of the features newly introduced in the Microsoft Windows 7 operating system

Some of the new features included in Windows 7 are advancements in touch, speech and handwriting recognition, support for virtual hard disks, support for additional file formats, improved performance on multi-core processors, improved boot performance, and kernel improvements. However starting with Windows 7, Microsoft Windows was deprecating some features that originated in earlier versions of Windows and included up to Windows Vista.

== Shell and user interface ==
Windows 7 retains the Windows Aero graphical user interface and visual style introduced in its predecessor, Windows Vista, but many areas have seen enhancements. Unlike Windows Vista, window borders and the taskbar do not turn opaque when a window is maximized while Windows Aero is active; instead, they remain translucent.

=== Desktop ===
The Desktop Slideshow feature in Windows 7

==== Themes ====
Support for themes has been extended in Windows 7. In addition to providing options to customize colors of window chrome and other aspects of the interface including the desktop background, icons, mouse cursors, and sound schemes, the operating system also includes a native desktop slideshow feature. A new theme pack extension has been introduced, .themepack, which is essentially a collection of cabinet files that consist of theme resources including background images, color preferences, desktop icons, mouse cursors, and sound schemes. The new theme extension simplifies sharing of themes and can also display desktop wallpapers via RSS feeds provided by the Windows RSS Platform. Microsoft provides additional themes for free through its website.

The default theme in Windows 7 consists of a single desktop wallpaper named "Harmony" and the default desktop icons, mouse cursors, and sound scheme introduced in Windows Vista; however, none of the desktop backgrounds included with Windows Vista are present in Windows 7. New themes include Architecture, Characters, Landscapes, Nature, and Scenes, and an additional country-specific theme that is determined based on the defined locale when the operating system is installed; although only the theme for a user's home country is displayed within the user interface, the files for all of these other country-specific themes are included in the operating system. All themes included in Windows 7—excluding the default theme—include six wallpaper images. A number of new sound schemes (each associated with an included theme) have also been introduced: Afternoon, Calligraphy, Characters, Cityscape, Delta, Festival, Garden, Heritage, Landscape, Quirky, Raga, Savana, and Sonata. Themes may introduce their own custom sounds, which can be used with other themes as well.

==== Desktop Slideshow ====
Windows 7 introduces a desktop slideshow feature that periodically changes the desktop wallpaper based on a user-defined interval; the change is accompanied by a smooth fade transition with a duration that can be customized via the Windows Registry. The desktop slideshow feature supports local images and images obtained via RSS.

==== Gadgets ====
With Windows Vista, Microsoft introduced the Windows Sidebar to host Microsoft Gadgets that displayed details such as feeds and sports scores; the gadgets could optionally be placed on the Windows desktop. With Windows 7, gadgets can still be placed on the Windows desktop, but the sidebar itself has been removed, and the platform has been renamed as Windows Desktop Gadgets. Gadgets are more closely integrated with Windows Explorer, but the gadgets themselves continue to operate in a single sidebar.exe process (unlike in Windows Vista where gadgets could operate in multiple sidebar.exe processes). New features for gadgets include:

- A context menu option on the desktop to access the Gadgets Gallery to add, display, or uninstall gadgets is now available
- Gadgets that display details from online sources can now also display content that has been cached
- High DPI support
- Larger controls designed for touch-based interaction
- Rearrangement capabilities automatically arrange gadgets based on their proximity with other gadgets
- When gadgets are displayed on the desktop, there is a context menu option to display or hide them; hiding gadgets can result in power savings

Windows 7 also introduces a single new gadget, one for Windows Media Center that displays links to the various sections (e.g., Pictures + Videos) of its interface.

==== Branding and customization ====
For original equipment manufacturers and enterprises, Windows 7 natively supports the ability to customize the wallpaper that is displayed during user login. Because the settings to change the wallpaper are available via the Windows Registry, users can also customize this wallpaper. Options to customize the appearance of interface lighting and shadows are also available.

=== Windows Explorer ===
Windows Explorer's revised user interface

==== Libraries ====
Windows Explorer in Windows 7 supports file libraries that aggregate content from various locations – including shared folders on networked systems if the shared folder has been indexed by the host system – and present them in a unified view. The libraries hide the actual location the file is stored in. Searching in a library automatically federates the query to the remote systems, in addition to searching on the local system, so that files on the remote systems are also searched. Unlike search folders, Libraries are backed by a physical location which allows files to be saved in the Libraries. Such files are transparently saved in the backing physical folder. The default save location for a library may be configured by the user, as can the default view layout for each library. Libraries are generally stored in the Libraries special folder, which allows them to be displayed on the Navigation Pane.

By default, a new user account in Windows 7 contains four libraries for different file types: Documents, Music, Pictures, and Videos. They are configured to include the user's profile folders for these respective file types, as well as the computer's corresponding Public folders. The Public folder also contains a hidden Recorded TV library that appears in the Windows Explorer sidepane when TV is set up in Media Center for the first time.

In addition to aggregating multiple storage locations, Libraries enable Arrangement Views and Search Filter Suggestions. Arrangement Views allow one to pivot their view of the library's contents based on metadata. For example, selecting the "By Month" view in the Pictures library will display photos in stacks, where each stack represents a month of photos based on the date they were taken. In the Music library, the "By Artist" view will display stacks of albums from the artists in a person's collection, and browsing into an artist stack will then display the relevant albums.

Search Filter Suggestions are a new feature of the Windows 7 Explorer's search box. When the user clicks in the search box, a menu shows up below it showing recent searches as well as suggested Advanced Query Syntax filters that the user can type. When one is selected (or typed in manually), the menu will update to show the possible values to filter by for that property, and this list is based on the current location and other parts of the query already typed. For example, selecting the "tags" filter or typing "tags:" into the search box will display the list of possible tag values which will return search results.

Arrangement Views and Search Filter Suggestions are database-backed features which require that all locations in the Library be indexed by the Windows Search service. Local disk locations must be indexed by the local indexer, and Windows Explorer will automatically add locations to the indexing scope when they are included in a library. Remote locations can be indexed by the indexer on another Windows 7 machine, on a Windows machine running Windows Search 4 (such as Windows Vista or Windows Home Server), or on another device that implements the MS-WSP remote query protocol.

==== Federated search ====
Windows Explorer also supports federating search to external data sources, such as custom databases or web services, that are exposed over the web and described via an OpenSearch definition. The federated location description (called a Search Connector) is provided as an .osdx file. Once installed, the data source becomes queryable directly from Windows Explorer. Windows Explorer features, such as previews and thumbnails, work with the results of a federated search as well.

==== Miscellaneous Shell enhancements ====
Windows Explorer has received numerous minor enhancements that improve its overall functionality. The address bar and search box can be resized. The Command Bar features the New Folder command and a visible interface option to enable the Preview Pane (both were previously in the Organize option in Windows Vista). A new Content icon view mode is added, which shows metadata and thumbnails. The List icon view mode provides more space between items than in Windows Vista. Storage capacity indicators for hard disks introduced in Windows Vista are now also shown for removable storage devices. File types for which new iFilters or Property Handlers are installed are reindexed by Windows Search by default.

The Navigation Pane includes a new Favorites location, which serves as the replacement for the Favorite Links functionality of the interface in Windows Vista, and newly created Saved Searches are automatically pinned to this location.

There is a new Share With button on the Command Bar that allows users to share the currently viewed folder or currently selected item with people in a homegroup with either read permissions or with both read and write permissions, or with specific people, which opens the Sharing Wizard introduced in Windows Vista; a new Nobody sharing option prevents the selected folder or item from being shared, and all items that are excluded in this manner feature a new padlock overlay icon.

Previously, adding submenus to Shell context menus or customizing the context menu's behavior for a certain folder was only possible by installing a form of plug-in known as Shell extensions. In Windows 7, however, users can edit the Windows Registry or configuration files. Additionally, a new Shell API was introduced designed to simplify the writing of context menu shell extensions by software developers.

Windows 7 includes native support for burning ISO files. The functionality is available when a user selects the Burn disc image option within the context menu of an ISO file (support for disc image verification is also included). In previous versions of Windows, users were required to install third-party software to burn ISO images.

=== Start menu ===
The start button now has a fade-in highlight effect when the user hovers over it with the mouse cursor. The right column of the Start menu is now prominently the Aero Glass color; in Windows Vista, it was predominantly black regardless of the color in use.

The search results pane in Windows 7, demonstrating a search for the word "wireless"

Windows 7's Start menu retains the two-column layout of its predecessors, with several functional changes:

- Documents, Music, and Pictures now link to their respective Libraries
- Jump Lists are presented in the Start Menu via a guillemet; when the user moves the mouse cursor over the guillemet or presses the → arrow key, the right-hand side of the Start menu is widened and replaced with the application's Jump List.
- New links include Devices and Printers (a new Device Manager), Downloads, HomeGroup, Recorded TV, and Videos
- Search has been updated to display results for Control Panel category keywords, federated searches, HomeGroup locations, Libraries (including network share locations when included in Libraries), and Sticky Notes
- Search results now group items in groups of three, and users can click a group to open Windows Explorer to see additional items that match the criteria
- The iconographic Shut Down button of Windows Vista has been replaced with a text link to indicate the action that will be taken when the button is clicked; the default action is now configurable through Taskbar and Start Menu Properties.

Group Policy settings for Windows Explorer provide the ability for administrators of an Active Directory domain to add up to five Internet Web sites and five additional "search connectors" to the Search Results view in the Start menu. The links, which appear at the bottom of the pane, allow the search to be executed again on the selected web site or search connector. Microsoft suggests that network administrators could use this feature to enable searching of corporate Intranets or an internal SharePoint server.

=== Taskbar ===
The Windows Taskbar has seen its most significant revision since its introduction in Windows 95 and combines the previous Quick Launch functionality with open application window icons. The taskbar is now rendered as an Aero Glass element whose color can be changed via the Personalization Control Panel. It is 10 pixels taller than in Windows Vista to accommodate touch screen input and a new larger default icon size (although a smaller taskbar size is available), as well as maintain proportion to newer high resolution monitor modes. Running applications are denoted by a border frame around the icon. Within this border, a color effect (dependent on the predominant color of the icon) that follows the mouse cursor also indicates the opened status of the application. The glass taskbar is more translucent than in Windows Vista. Taskbar buttons show icons by default, hidden app titles, unless they are set to 'not combine', or 'combine when taskbar is full.' In this case, only icons are shown when the application is not running. Programs running or pinned on the taskbar can be rearranged. Items in the notification area can also be rearranged.

The default taskbar of Windows 7

==== Pinned applications ====
The Windows 7 taskbar is more application-oriented than window-oriented, and therefore doesn't show window titles (these are shown when an application icon is clicked or hovered over). Applications can now be pinned to the taskbar allowing the user instant access to the applications they commonly use. There are a few ways to pin applications to the taskbar. Icons can be dragged and dropped onto the taskbar, or the application's icon can be right-clicked to pin it to the taskbar. The Quick Launch toolbar has been removed from the default configuration, but can be manually added back.

The Windows 7 taskbar shows a preview of the window.

==== Thumbnail previews ====
Thumbnail previews which were introduced in Windows Vista have been expanded to not only preview the windows opened by the application in a small-sized thumbnail view, but to also interact with them. The user can close any window opened by clicking the X on the corresponding thumbnail preview. The name of the window is also shown in the thumbnail preview. A "peek" at the window is obtained by hovering over the thumbnail preview. Peeking brings up only the window of the thumbnail preview over which the mouse cursor hovers, and turns any other windows on the desktop transparent. This also works for tabs in Internet Explorer: individual tabs may be peeked at in the thumbnail previews. Thumbnail previews integrate Thumbnail Toolbars which can control the application from the thumbnail previews themselves. For example, if Windows Media Player is opened and the mouse cursor is hovering on the application icon, the thumbnail preview will allow the user the ability to Play, Stop, and Play Next/Previous track without having to switch to the Windows Media Player window.

Windows Media Player Jump List

==== Jump lists ====
Jump lists are menu options available by right-clicking a taskbar icon or holding the left mouse button and sliding towards the center of the desktop on an icon. Each application has a jump list corresponding to its features, Microsoft Word's displaying recently opened documents; Windows Media Player's recent tracks and playlists; frequently opened directories in Windows Explorer; Internet Explorer's recent browsing history and options for opening new tabs or starting InPrivate Browsing; Windows Live Messenger's common tasks such as instant messaging, signing off, and changing online status. Third-party software can add custom actions through a dedicated API. Up to 10 menu items may appear on a list, partially customizable by user. Frequently used files and folders can be pinned by the user as to not get usurped from the list if others are opened more frequently.

==== Task progress ====
A testing program using Task progress

Progress bar in taskbar's tasks allows users to know the progress of a task without switching to the pending window. Task progress is used in Windows Explorer, Internet Explorer and third-party software.

==== Notification area ====
The redesigned notification area with balloon notification showing Action Center messages

The notification area has been redesigned; the standard Volume, Network, Power and Action Center status icons are present, but no other application icons are shown unless the user has chosen them to be shown. A new "Notification Area Icons" control panel has been added which replaces the "Customize Notification Icons" dialog box in the "Taskbar and Start Menu Properties" window first introduced in Windows XP. In addition to being able to configure whether the application icons are shown, the ability to hide each application's notification balloons has been added. The user can then view the notifications at a later time.

A triangle to the left of the visible notification icons displays the hidden notification icons. Unlike Windows Vista and Windows XP, the hidden icons are displayed in a window above the taskbar, instead of on the taskbar. Icons can be dragged between this window and the notification area.

Windows 7 desktop displayed through Peek

==== Aero Peek ====
In previous versions of Windows, the taskbar ended with the notification area on the right-hand side. Windows 7, however, introduces a show desktop button on the far right side of the taskbar which can initiate an Aero Peek feature that makes all open windows translucent when hovered over by a mouse cursor. Clicking this button shows the desktop, and clicking it again brings all windows to focus. The new button replaces the show desktop shortcut located in the Quick Launch toolbar in previous versions of Windows.

On touch-based devices, Aero Peek can be initiated by pressing and holding the show desktop button; touching the button itself shows the desktop. The button also increases in width to accommodate being pressed by a finger.

=== Window management mouse gestures ===
==== Aero Snap ====
Windows can be dragged to the top of the screen to maximize them and dragged away to restore them. Dragging a window to the left or right of the screen makes it take up half the screen, allowing the user to tile two windows next to each other. Also, resizing the window to the bottom of the screen or its top will extend the window to full height but retain its width. These features can be disabled via the Ease of Access Center if users do not wish the windows to automatically resize.

==== Aero Shake ====
Aero Shake allows users to clear up any clutter on their screen by shaking (dragging back and forth) a window of their choice with the mouse. All other windows will minimize, while the window the user shook stays active on the screen. When the window is shaken again, all previously minimized windows are restored, similar to desktop preview.

=== Keyboard shortcuts ===
A variety of new keyboard shortcuts have been introduced.

Global keyboard shortcuts:

- ⊞ Win+Space bar operates as a keyboard shortcut for Aero Peek.
- ⊞ Win+↑ maximizes the current window.
- ⊞ Win+↓ if current window is maximized, restores it; otherwise minimizes current window.
- ⊞ Win+⇧ Shift+↑ makes upper and lower edge of current window nearly touch the upper and lower edge of the Windows desktop environment, respectively.
- ⊞ Win+⇧ Shift+↓ restores the original size of the current window.
- ⊞ Win+← snaps the current window to the left edge of the screen.
- ⊞ Win+→ snaps the current window to the right half of the screen.
- ⊞ Win+⇧ Shift+← and ⊞ Win+⇧ Shift+→ move the current window to the left or right display.
- ⊞ Win++ functions as zoom in command wherever applicable.
- ⊞ Win+− functions as zoom out command wherever applicable.
- ⊞ Win+ESC turn off zoom once enabled.
- ⊞ Win+Home operates as a keyboard shortcut for Aero Shake.
- ⊞ Win+P Opens Connect to a Network Projector, which has been updated from previous versions of Windows, and allows one to dictate where the desktop is displayed: on the main monitor, an external display, both; or allows one to display two independent desktops on two separate monitors.

Taskbar:

- Shift + Click, or Middle click starts a new instance of the application, regardless of whether it's already running.
- Ctrl + Shift + Click starts a new instance with Administrator privileges; by default, a User Account Control prompt will be displayed.
- Shift + Right-click (or right-clicking the program's thumbnail) shows the titlebar's context menu which, by default, contains "Restore", "Move", "Size", "Maximize", "Minimize" and "Close" commands. If the icon being clicked on is a grouped icon, a specialized context menu with "Restore All", "Minimize All", and "Close All" commands is shown.
- Ctrl + Click on a grouped icon cycles between the windows (or tabs) in the group.

=== Font management ===
The user interface for font management has been overhauled in Windows 7. As with Windows Vista, the collection of installed fonts is displayed in a Windows Explorer window, but fonts that originate from the same font family appear as icons that are represented as stacks that display font previews within the interface. Windows 7 also introduces the option to hide installed fonts; certain fonts are automatically removed from view based on a user's regional settings. An option to manually hide installed fonts is also available. Hidden fonts remain installed but are not enumerated when an application asks for a list of available fonts, thus reducing the amount of fonts to scroll through within the interface and also reducing memory usage. Windows 7 includes over 40 new fonts, including a new "Gabriola" font.

The dialog box for fonts in Windows 7 has also been updated to display font previews within the interface, which allows users to preview fonts before selecting them. Previous versions of windows only displayed the name of the font.

The ClearType Text Tuner which was previously available as a Microsoft Powertoy for earlier Windows versions has been integrated into, and updated for Windows 7.

Microsoft would later backport Windows 8 Emoji features to Windows 7.

=== Devices ===
There are two major new user interface components for device management in Windows 7, "Devices and Printers" and "Device Stage". Both of these are integrated with Windows Explorer, and together provide a simplified view of what devices are connected to the computer, and what capabilities they support.

==== Devices and Printers ====
The new Devices and Printers Control Panel. Custom icons can be downloaded via the Internet.

Devices and Printers is a new Control Panel interface that is directly accessible from the Start menu. Unlike the Device Manager Control Panel applet, which is still present, the icons shown on the Devices and Printers screen are limited to components of the system that a non-expert user will recognize as plug-in devices. For example, an external monitor connected to the system will be displayed as a device, but the internal monitor on a laptop will not. Device-specific features are available through the context menu for each device; an external monitor's context menu, for example, provides a link to the "Display Settings" control panel.

This new Control Panel applet also replaces the "Printers" window in prior versions of Windows; common printer operations such as setting the default printer, installing or removing printers, and configuring properties such as paper size are done through this control panel.

Windows 7 and Server 2008 R2 introduce print driver isolation, which improves the reliability of the print spooler by running printer drivers in a separate process to the spooler service. If a third party print driver fails while isolated, it does not impact other drivers or the print spooler service.

==== Device Stage ====
A Device Stage window showing available options for a Microsoft Wireless Comfort Keyboard 4000

Device Stage provides a centralized location for an externally connected multi-function device to present its functionality to the user. When a device such as a portable music player is connected to the system, the device appears as an icon on the task bar, as well as in Windows Explorer.

Windows 7 ships with high-resolution images of a number of popular devices, and is capable of connecting to the Internet to download images of devices it doesn't recognize. Opening the icon presents a window that displays actions relevant to that device. Screenshots of the technology presented by Microsoft suggest that a mobile phone could offer options for two-way synchronization, configuring ring-tones, copying pictures and videos, managing the device in Windows Media Player, and using Windows Explorer to navigate through the device. Other device status information such as free memory and battery life can also be shown. The actual per-device functionality is defined via XML files that are downloaded when the device is first connected to the computer, or are provided by the manufacturer on an installation disc.

== Mobility enhancements ==
=== Multi-touch support ===
Hilton Locke, who worked on the Tablet PC team at Microsoft, reported on December 11, 2007 that Windows 7 will have new touch features on devices supporting multi-touch. An overview and demonstration of the multi-touch capabilities, including a virtual piano program, a mapping and directions program and a touch-aware version of Microsoft Paint, was given at the All Things Digital Conference on May 27, 2008; a video of the multi-touch capabilities was made available on the web later the same day.

=== Sensors ===
Windows 7 introduces native support for sensors, including accelerometer sensors, ambient light sensors, and location-based sensors; the operating system also provides a unified driver model for sensor devices. A notable use of this technology in Windows 7 is the operating system's adaptive display brightness feature, which automatically adjusts the brightness of a compatible computer's display based on environmental light conditions and factors. Gadgets developed for Windows 7 can also display location-based information. Applications for certain sensor capabilities can be developed without the requisite hardware.

Because data acquired by some sensors can be considered personally identifiable information, all sensors are disabled by default in Windows 7, and an account in Windows 7 requires administrative permissions to enable a sensor. Sensors also require user consent to share location data.

== Power management ==
=== Battery notification messages ===
Unlike previous versions of Windows, Windows 7 is able to report when a laptop battery is in need of a replacement. The operating system works with design capabilities present in modern laptop batteries to report this information.

=== Hibernation improvements ===
The powercfg command enables the customization of the hibernation file size. By default, Windows 7 automatically sets the size of the hibernation file to 75% of a computer's total physical memory. The operating system also compresses the contents of memory during the hibernate process to minimize the possibility that the contents exceeds the default size of the hibernation file.

=== Power analysis and reporting ===
Windows 7 introduces a new /Energy parameter for the powercfg command, which generates an HTML report of a computer's energy efficiency and displays information related to devices or settings.

=== USB suspension ===
Windows 7 can individually suspend USB hubs and supports selective suspend for all in-box USB class drivers.

=== Other improvements ===
Windows 7 supports ACPI 4.0, and natively supports ACPI vendor C-states (Intel and AMD) up to C6. Windows 7 SP1 added supports for ACPI vendor C-states up to C10.

== Graphics ==
=== DirectX ===
- Direct3D 11 is included with Windows 7. It is a strict super-set of Direct3D 10.1, which was introduced in Windows Vista Service Pack 1 and Windows Server 2008.
- Direct2D and DirectWrite, new hardware-accelerated vector graphics and font rendering APIs built on top of Direct3D 10 that are intended to replace GDI/GDI+ for screen-oriented native-code graphics and text drawing. They can be used from managed applications with the Windows API Code Pack
- Windows Advanced Rasterization Platform (WARP), a software rasterizer component for DirectX that provides all of the capabilities of Direct3D 10.0 and 10.1 in software.
- DirectX Video Acceleration-High Definition (DXVA-HD)

Direct3D 11, Direct2D, DirectWrite, DXGI 1.1, WARP and several other components are currently available for Windows Vista SP2 and Windows Server 2008 SP2 by installing the Platform Update for Windows Vista.

=== Desktop Window Manager ===
First introduced in Windows Vista, the Desktop Window Manager (DWM) in Windows 7 has been updated to use version 10.1 of Direct3D API, and its performance has been improved significantly.

The Desktop Window Manager still requires at least a Direct3D 9-capable video card (supported with new D3D10_FEATURE_LEVEL_9_n device type introduced with the Direct3D 11 runtime).

With a video driver conforming to Windows Display Driver Model v1.1, DXGI kernel in Windows 7 provides 2D hardware acceleration to APIs such as GDI, Direct2D and DirectWrite (though GDI+ was not updated to use this functionality). This allows DWM to use significantly lower amounts of system memory, which do not grow regardless of how many windows are opened, like it was in Windows Vista. Systems equipped with a WDDM 1.0 video card will operate in the same fashion as in Windows Vista, using software-only rendering.

The Desktop Window Manager in Windows 7 also adds support for systems using multiple heterogeneous graphics cards from different vendors.

=== Other changes ===
Support for color depths of 30 and 48 bits is included, along with the wide color gamut scRGB (which for HDMI 1.3 can be converted and output as xvYCC). The video modes supported in Windows 7 are 16-bit sRGB, 24-bit sRGB, 30-bit sRGB, 30-bit with extended color gamut sRGB, and 48-bit scRGB.

Each user of Windows 7 and Server 2008 R2 has individual DPI settings, rather than the machine having a single setting as in previous versions of Windows. DPI settings can be changed by logging on and off, without needing to restart.

== File system ==
=== Solid state drives ===
Over time, several technologies have been incorporated into subsequent versions of Windows to improve the performance of the operating system on traditional hard disk drives (HDD) with rotating platters. Since Solid-state drives (SSD) differ from mechanical HDDs in some key areas (no moving parts, write amplification, limited number of erase cycles allowed for reliable operation), it is beneficial to disable certain optimizations and add others.

Windows 7 incorporates many engineering changes to reduce the frequency of writes and flushes, which benefit SSDs in particular since each write operation wears the flash memory.

Windows 7 also makes use of the TRIM command. If supported by the SSD (not implemented on early devices), this optimizes when erase cycles are performed, reducing the need to erase blocks before each write and increasing write performance.

Several tools and techniques that were implemented in the past to reduce the impact of the rotational latency of traditional HDDs, most notably disk defragmentation, SuperFetch, ReadyBoost, and application launch prefetching, involve reorganizing (rewriting) the data on the platters. Since SSDs have no moving platters, this reorganization has no advantages, and may instead shorten the life of the solid state memory. Therefore, these tools are by default disabled on SSDs in Windows 7, except for some early generation SSDs that might still benefit.

Finally, partitions made with Windows 7's partition-creating tools are created with the SSD's alignment needs in mind, avoiding unwanted systematic write amplification.

=== Virtual hard disks ===
The Enterprise and Ultimate editions of Windows 7 incorporate support for the Virtual Hard Disk (VHD) file format. VHD files can be mounted as drives, created, and booted from, in the same way as WIM files. Furthermore, an installed version of Windows 7 can be booted and run from a VHD drive, even on non-virtual hardware, thereby providing a new way to multi boot Windows. Some features such as hibernation and BitLocker are not available when booting from VHD.

=== Disk partitioning ===
By default, a computer's disk is partitioned into two partitions: one of limited size for booting, BitLocker and running the Windows Recovery Environment and the second with the operating system and user files.

=== Removable media ===
Windows 7 has also seen improvements to the Safely Remove Hardware menu, including the ability to eject just one camera card at the same time (from a single hub) and retain the ports for future use without reboot; and the labels of removable media are now also listed, rather than just the drive letter. Windows Explorer now by default only shows memory card reader ports in My Computer if they contain a card.

=== BitLocker to Go ===
BitLocker brings encryption support to removable disks such as USB drives. Such devices can be protected by a passphrase, a recovery key, or be automatically unlocked on a computer.

== Boot performance ==
According to data gathered from the Microsoft Customer Experience Improvement Program (CEIP), 35% of Vista SP1 installations boot up in 30 seconds or less. The more lengthy boot times on the remainder of the machines are mainly due to some services or programs that are loaded but are not required when the system is first started. Microsoft's Mike Fortin, a distinguished engineer on the Windows team, noted in August 2008 that Microsoft has set aside a team to work solely on the issue, and that team aims to "significantly increase the number of systems that experience very good boot times". They "focused very hard on increasing parallelism of driver initialization". Also, Microsoft aims to "dramatically reduce" the number of system services, along with their demands on processors, storage, and memory.

== Kernel and scheduling improvements ==
=== User-mode scheduler ===
The 64-bit versions of Windows 7 and Server 2008 R2 introduce a user-mode scheduling framework. On Microsoft Windows operating systems, scheduling of threads inside a process is handled by the kernel, ntoskrnl.exe. While for most applications this is sufficient, applications with large concurrent threading requirements, such as a database server, can benefit from having a thread scheduler in-process. This is because the kernel no longer needs to be involved in context switches between threads, and it obviates the need for a thread pool mechanism, as threads can be created and destroyed much more quickly when no kernel context switches are required.

Prior to Windows 7, Windows used a one-to-one user thread to kernel-thread relationship. It was of course always possible to cobble together a rough many-to-one user-scheduler (with user-level timer interrupts) but if a system call was blocked on any one of the user threads, it would block the kernel thread and accordingly block all other user threads on the same scheduler. A many-to-one model could not take full advantage of symmetric multiprocessing.

With Windows 7's user-mode scheduling, a program may configure one or more kernel threads as a scheduler supplied by a programming language library (one per logical processor desired) and then create a user-mode thread pool from which these UMS can draw. The kernel maintains a list of outstanding system calls which allows the UMS to continue running without blocking the kernel thread. This configuration can be used as either many-to-one or many-to-many.

There are several benefits to a user mode scheduler. Context switching in User Mode can be faster. UMS also introduces cooperative multitasking. Having customizable scheduler also gives more control over thread execution.

=== Memory management and CPU parallelism ===
- The memory manager is optimized to mitigate the problem of total memory consumption in the event of excessive cached read operations, which occurred on earlier releases of 64-bit Windows.
- Support for up to 256 logical processors
- Fewer hardware locks and greater parallelism
- Timer coalescing: modern processors and chipsets can switch to very low power usage levels while the CPU is idle. In order to reduce the number of times the CPU enters and exits idle states, Windows 7 introduces the concept of "timer coalescing"; multiple applications or device drivers which perform actions on a regular basis can be set to occur at once, instead of each action being performed on their own schedule. This facility is available in both kernel mode, via the KeSetCoalesableTimer API (which would be used in place of KeSetTimerEx), and in user mode with the SetWaitableTimerEx Windows API call (which replaces SetWaitableTimer).

== Multimedia ==
=== Windows Media Center ===
Windows Media Center in Windows 7 has retained much of the design and feel of its predecessor, but with a variety of user interface shortcuts and browsing capabilities. Playback of H.264 video both locally and through a Media Center Extender (including the Xbox 360) is supported.

Some notable enhancements in Windows 7 Media Center include a new mini guide, a new scrub bar, the option to color code the guide by show type, and internet content that is more tightly integrated with regular TV via the guide. All Windows 7 versions now support up to four tuners of each type (QAM, ATSC, CableCARD, NTSC, etc.).

When browsing the media library, items that don't have album art are shown in a range of foreground and background color combinations instead of using white text on a blue background. When the left or right remote control buttons are held down to browse the library quickly, a two-letter prefix of the current album name is prominently shown as a visual aid. The Picture Library includes new slideshow capabilities, and individual pictures can be rated.

Also, while browsing a media library, a new column appears at the top named "Shared." This allows users to access shared media libraries on other Media Center PCs from directly within Media Center.

For television support, the Windows Media Center "TV Pack" released by Microsoft in 2008 is incorporated into Windows Media Center. This includes support for CableCARD and North American (ATSC) clear QAM tuners, as well as creating lists of favorite stations.

A gadget for Windows Media Center is also included.

=== Format support ===
Windows 7 includes AVI, WAV, AAC/ADTS file media sinks to read the respective formats, an MPEG-4 file source to read MP4, M4A, M4V, MP4V MOV and 3GP container formats and an MPEG-4 file sink to output to MP4 format. Windows 7 also includes a media source to read MPEG transport stream/BDAV MPEG-2 transport stream (M2TS, MTS, M2T and AVCHD) files.

Transcoding (encoding) support is not exposed through any built-in Windows application but codecs are included as Media Foundation Transforms (MFTs). In addition to Windows Media Audio and Windows Media Video encoders and decoders, and ASF file sink and file source introduced in Windows Vista, Windows 7 includes an H.264 encoder with Baseline profile level 3 and Main profile support and an AAC Low Complexity (AAC-LC) profile encoder.

For playback of various media formats, Windows 7 also introduces an H.264 decoder with Baseline, Main, and High profiles support, up to level 5.1, AAC-LC and HE-AAC v1 (SBR) multichannel, HE-AAC v2 (PS) stereo decoders, MPEG-4 Part 2 Simple Profile and Advanced Simple Profile decoders which includes decoding popular codec implementations such as DivX, Xvid and Nero Digital as well as MJPEG and DV MFT decoders for AVI. Windows Media Player 12 uses the built-in Media Foundation codecs to play these formats by default.

Windows 7 also updates the DirectShow filters introduced in Windows Vista for playback of MPEG-2 and Dolby Digital to decode H.264, AAC, HE-AAC v1 and v2 and Dolby Digital Plus (including downmixing to Dolby Digital).

== Security ==
The new Action Center which replaces Windows Security Center

Action Center displaying notification of security threats

Action Center, formerly Windows Security Center, now encompasses both security and maintenance. It was called Windows Health Center and Windows Solution Center in earlier builds.

A new user interface for User Account Control has been introduced, which provides the ability to select four different levels of notifications, one of these notification settings, Default, is new to Windows 7. Geo-tracking capabilities are also available in Windows 7. The feature will be disabled by default. When enabled the user will only have limited control as to which applications can track their location.

The Encrypting File System supports Elliptic-curve cryptographic algorithms (ECC) in Windows 7. For backward compatibility with previous releases of Windows, Windows 7 supports a mixed-mode operation of ECC and RSA algorithms. EFS self-signed certificates, when using ECC, will use 256-bit key by default. EFS can be configured to use 1K/2k/4k/8k/16k-bit keys when using self-signed RSA certificates, or 256/384/512-bit keys when using ECC certificates.

In Windows Vista, the Protected User-Mode Audio (PUMA) content protection facilities are only available to applications that are running in a Protected Media Path environment. Because only the Media Foundation application programming interface could interact with this environment, a media player application had to be designed to use Media Foundation. In Windows 7, this restriction is lifted. PUMA also incorporates stricter enforcement of "Copy Never" bits when using Serial Copy Management System (SCMS) copy protection over an S/PDIF connection, as well as with High-bandwidth Digital Content Protection (HDCP) over HDMI connections.

=== Biometrics ===
Windows 7 includes the new Windows Biometric Framework. This framework consists of a set of components that standardizes the use of fingerprint biometric devices. In prior releases of Microsoft Windows, biometric hardware device manufacturers were required to provide a complete stack of software to support their device, including device drivers, software development kits, and support applications. Microsoft noted in a white paper on the Windows Biometric Framework that the proliferation of these proprietary stacks resulted in compatibility issues, compromised the quality and reliability of the system, and made servicing and maintenance more difficult. By incorporating the core biometric functionality into the operating system, Microsoft aims to bring biometric device support on par with other classes of devices.

A new Control Panel called Biometric Device Control Panel is included which provides an interface for deleting stored biometrics information, troubleshooting, and enabling or disabling the types of logins that are allowed using biometrics. Biometrics configuration can also be configured using Group Policy settings.

== Networking ==
- DirectAccess, a VPN tunnel technology based on IPv6 and IPsec. DirectAccess requires domain-joined machines, Windows Server 2008 R2 on the DirectAccess server, at least Windows Server 2008 domain controllers and a PKI to issue authentication certificates.
- BranchCache, a WAN optimization technology.
- The Bluetooth stack includes improvements introduced in the Windows Vista Feature Pack for Wireless, namely, Bluetooth 2.1+EDR support and remote wake from S3 or S4 support for self-powered Bluetooth modules.
- NDIS 6.20 (Network Driver Interface Specification)
- WWAN (Mobile broadband) support (driver model based on NDIS miniport driver for CDMA and GSM device interfaces, Connection Manager support and Mobile Broadband COM and COM Interop API).
- Wireless Hosted Network capabilities: The Windows 7 wireless LAN service supports two new functions – Virtual Wi-Fi, that allows a single wireless network adapter to act like two client devices, or a software-based wireless access point (SoftAP) to act as both a wireless hotspot in infrastructure mode and a wireless client at the same time. This feature is not exposed through the GUI; however the Virtual WiFi Miniport adapter can be installed and enabled for wireless adapters with drivers that support a hosted network by using the command netsh wlan set hostednetwork mode=allow "ssid=<network SSID>" "key=<wlan security key>" keyusage=persistent|temporary at an elevated command prompt. The wireless SoftAP can afterwards be started using the command netsh wlan start hostednetwork. Windows 7 also supports WPA2-PSK/AES security for the hosted network, but DNS resolution for clients requires it to be used with Internet Connection Sharing or a similar feature.
- SMB 2.1, which includes minor performance enhancements over SMB2, such as a new opportunistic locking mechanism.
- RDP 7.0
- Background Intelligent Transfer Service 4.0

=== HomeGroup ===
Alongside the workgroup system used by previous versions, Windows 7 adds a new ad hoc home networking system known as HomeGroup. The system uses a password to join computers into the group, and allows users' libraries, along with individual files and folders, to be shared between multiple computers. Only computers running Windows 7 to Windows 10 version 1709 can create or join a HomeGroup; however, users can make files and printers shared in a HomeGroup accessible to Windows XP and Windows Vista through a separate account, dedicated to sharing HomeGroup content, that uses traditional Windows sharing. HomeGroup support was deprecated in Windows 10 and has been removed from Windows 10 version 1803 and later.

HomeGroup as a concept is very similar to a feature slated for Windows Vista, known as Castle, which would have made it possible to have an identification service for all members on the network, without a centralized server.

HomeGroup is created in response to the need for a simple sharing model for inexperienced users who need to share files without wrestling with user accounts, Security descriptors and share permissions. To that end, Microsoft previously created Simple File Sharing mode in Windows XP that, once enabled, caused all connected computers to be authenticated as Guest. Under this model, either a certain file or folder was shared with anyone who connects to the network (even unauthorized parties who are in range of the wireless network) or was not shared at all. In a HomeGroup, however:

1. Communication between HomeGroup computers is encrypted with a pre-shared password.
2. A certain file or folder can be shared with the entire HomeGroup (anyone who joins) or a certain person only.
3. HomeGroup computers can also be a member of a Windows domain or Windows workgroup at the same time and take advantage of those file sharing mechanisms.
4. Only computers that support HomeGroup (Windows 7 to Windows 10 version 1709) can join the network.

=== Windows Firewall ===
Windows 7 adds support for multiple firewall profiles. The Windows Firewall in Windows Vista dynamically changes which network traffic is allowed or blocked based on the location of the computer (based on which network it is connected to). This approach falls short if the computer is connected to more than one network at the same time (as for a computer with both an Ethernet and a wireless interface). In this case, Vista applies the profile that is more secure to all network connections. This is often not desirable; Windows 7 resolves this by being able to apply a separate firewall profile to each network connection.

=== DNSSEC ===
Windows 7 and Windows Server 2008 R2 introduce support for Domain Name System Security Extensions (DNSSEC), a set of specifications for securing certain kinds of information provided by the Domain Name System (DNS) as used on Internet Protocol (IP) networks. DNSSEC employs digital signatures to ensure the authenticity of DNS data received from a DNS server, which protect against DNS cache poisoning attacks.

== Management features ==
Windows PowerShell Integrated Scripting Environment (ISE)

Windows 7 contains Windows PowerShell 2.0 out-of-the-box, which is also available as a download to install on older platforms:

- Windows Troubleshooting Platform
- Windows PowerShell Integrated Scripting Environment
- PowerShell Remoting

Other new management features include:

- AppLocker (a set of Group Policy settings that evolved from Software Restriction Policies, to restrict which applications can run on a corporate network, including the ability to restrict based on the application's version number or publisher)
- Group Policy Preferences (also available as a download for Windows XP and Windows Vista).
- The Windows Automation API (also available as a download for Windows XP and Windows Vista).

== Upgraded components ==
WordPad in Windows 7

Windows 7 includes Internet Explorer 8, .NET Framework 3.5 SP1, Internet Information Services (IIS) 7.5, Windows Installer 5.0 and a standalone XPS Viewer. Paint, Calculator, Resource Monitor, on-screen keyboard, and WordPad have also been updated.

Paint and WordPad feature a Ribbon interface similar to the one introduced in Office 2007, with both sporting several new features. WordPad supports Office Open XML and ODF file formats.

Calculator has been rewritten, with multiline capabilities including Programmer and Statistics modes, unit conversion, and date calculations. Calculator was also given a graphical facelift, the first since Windows 95 in 1995 and Windows NT 4.0 in 1996.

Sticky Notes of Windows XP Tablet PC Edition 2002 and the similar Sticky Notes Gadget introduced in Windows Vista have been replaced with a new Sticky Notes application that supports new Windows 7 taskbar features — a thumbnail preview of a stack representing all minimized notes, and Jump Lists on the taskbar and Start menu to create a New Note — and full-text-based search in the Windows Shell through an IFilter and protocol handler for all notes. Real-time stylus (both pen and touch input) is also supported.

Resource Monitor includes an improved RAM usage display and supports display of TCP/IP ports being listened to, filtering processes using networking, filtering processes with disk activity and listing and searching process handles (e.g. files used by a process) and loaded modules (files required by an executable file, e.g. DLL files).

Microsoft Magnifier, an accessibility utility for low vision users has been dramatically improved. Magnifier now supports the full screen zoom feature, whereas previous Windows versions had the Magnifier attached to the top of the screen in a dock layout. The new full screen feature is enabled by default, however, it requires Windows Aero for the advantage of the full screen zoom feature. If Windows is set to the Windows 7 Basic, Windows Classic, or High Contrast themes, as well as having Magnifier to use a docked window instead of full screen, Magnifier will still function like it did in Windows Vista and earlier.

Windows Installer 5.0 supports installing and configuring Windows Services, and provides developers with more control over setting permissions during software installation. Neither of these features will be available for prior versions of Windows; custom actions to support these features will continue to be required for Windows Installer packages that need to implement these features.

== Other features ==
- Windows 7 improves the Tablet PC Input Panel to make faster corrections using new gestures, supports text prediction in the soft keyboard and introduces a new Math Input Panel for inputting math into programs that support MathML. It recognizes handwritten math expressions and formulas. Additional language support for handwriting recognition can be gained by installing the respective MUI pack for that language (also called language pack).
- Windows 7 introduces a new Problem Steps Recorder tool that enables users to record their interaction with software for analysis and support. The feature can be used to replicate a problem to show support when and where a problem occurred.
- As opposed to the mostly blank start-up screen in Windows Vista, Windows 7's start-up screen consists of an animation featuring four colored light balls (one red, one yellow, one green, and one blue). They twirl around for a few seconds and then merge to form a glowing Windows logo. This only occurs on displays with a vertical resolution of 768 pixels or higher, as the animation is rendered at 1024x768. Any screen with a resolution below this displays the same startup screen that Vista used, which can also be forced to be displayed by manually editing BCD settings.
- The Starter Edition of Windows 7 can run an unlimited number of applications, compared to only 3 in Windows Vista Starter. Microsoft had initially intended to ship Windows 7 Starter Edition with this limitation, but announced after the release of the Release Candidate that this restriction would not be imposed in the final release.
- For developers, Windows 7 includes a new networking API with support for building SOAP-based web services in native code (as opposed to .NET-based WCF web services), new features to shorten application install times, reduced UAC prompts, simplified development of installation packages, and improved globalization support through a new Extended Linguistic Services API.
- If an application crashes twice in a row, Windows 7 will automatically attempt to apply a shim. If an application fails to install a similar self-correcting fix, a tool that asks some questions about the application launches.
- Windows 7 includes an optional TIFF IFilter that enables indexing of TIFF documents by reading them with optical character recognition (OCR), thus making their text content searchable. TIFF iFilter supports Adobe TIFF Revision 6.0 specifications and four compression schemes: LZW, JPEG, CCITT v4, CCITT v6
- The Windows Console now adheres to the current Windows theme instead of it being shown in the Windows Classic theme.
- Games such as Internet Spades, Internet Backgammon and Internet Checkers, which were removed from Windows Vista, were brought back in Windows 7.
- Users can disable as many more Windows components than was possible in Windows Vista. The new components which can now be disabled include: Handwriting Recognition, Internet Explorer, Windows DVD Maker, Windows Fax and Scan, Windows Gadget Platform Windows Media Center, Windows Media Player, Windows Search, and the XPS Viewer (with its services).
- Windows XP Mode is a fully functioning copy of 32-bit Windows XP Professional SP3 running in a virtual machine in Windows Virtual PC (as opposed to Hyper-V) running on top of Windows 7. Through the use of the RDP protocol, it allows applications incompatible with Windows 7 to be run on the underlying Windows XP virtual machine, but still to appear to be part of the Windows 7 desktop, thereby sharing the native Start Menu of Windows 7 as well as participating in file type associations. It is not distributed with Windows 7 media, but is offered as a free download to users of the Professional, Enterprise and Ultimate editions from Microsoft's web site. Users of Home Premium who want Windows XP functionality on their systems can download Windows Virtual PC free of charge, but must provide their own licensed copy of Windows XP. XP Mode is intended for consumers rather than enterprises, as it offers no central management capabilities. Microsoft Enterprise Desktop Virtualization (Med-V) is available for the enterprise market.
- Windows 7 has native support for Hyper-V virtual machines through the inclusion of VMBus integration drivers.
- Supports AVCHD camera support and Universal Video Class 1.1.
- Supports Protected Broadcast Driver Architecture (PBDA) for TV tuner cards, first implemented in Windows Media Center TV Pack 2008 for Windows Vista.
- Multi-function devices and Device Containers: Prior to Windows 7, every device attached to the system was treated as a single functional end-point, known as a devnode, that has a set of capabilities and a "status". While this is appropriate for single-function devices (such as a keyboard or scanner), it does not accurately represent multi-function devices such as a combined printer, fax machine, and scanner, or web-cams with a built-in microphone. In Windows 7, the drivers and status information for multi-function device can be grouped together as a single "Device Container", which is presented to the user in the new "Devices and Printers" Control Panel as a single unit. This capability is provided by a new Plug and Play property, ContainerID, which is a Globally Unique Identifier that is different for every instance of a physical device. The Container ID can be embedded within the device by the manufacturer, or created by Windows and associated with each devnode when it is first connected to the computer. In order to ensure the uniqueness of the generated Container ID, Windows will attempt to use information unique to the device, such as a MAC address or USB serial number. Devices connected to the computer via USB, IEEE 1394 (FireWire), eSATA, PCI Express, Bluetooth, and Windows Rally's PnP-X support can make use of Device Containers.
- Windows 7 also contains a new FireWire (IEEE 1394) stack that fully supports IEEE 1394b with S800, S1600 and S3200 data rates.
- Windows 7 now offers the ability to join a domain offline.
- Service Control Manager in conjunction with the Windows Task Scheduler supports trigger-start services.

== See also ==
- New features by Windows version:
  - XP
  - Vista
  - 7
  - 8
  - 10
  - 11
- Removed features by Windows version:
  - XP
  - Vista
  - 7
  - 8
  - 10
  - 11
