= Microsoft Search Server =

Enterprise search software from Microsoft

Microsoft Search Server (MSS) was an enterprise search platform from Microsoft, based on the search capabilities of Microsoft Office SharePoint Server. MSS shared its architectural underpinnings with the Windows Search platform for both the querying engine and the indexer. Microsoft Search Server was once known as SharePoint Server for Search.

Microsoft Search Server was made available as Search Server 2008, which was released in the first half of 2008. In 2010, Search Server 2010 http://www.microsoft.com/enterprisesearch/searchserverexpress/en/us/technical-resources.aspx became available, including a free version, named Search Server 2010 Express. The express edition featured the same feature-set as the commercial edition, including no limitation on the number of files indexed; however, it was limited to a stand-alone installation and could not be scaled out to a cluster. A release candidate of Search Server Express 2008 was made available on November 7, 2007 and was scheduled to Release to Manufacturing (RTM) in sync with Search Server 2008.

A more detailed comparison of the feature differences between Search Server 2008, Search Server 2010, and Search Server 2010 Express can be found at http://www.microsoft.com/enterprisesearch/searchserverexpress/en/us/compare.aspx

== Overview ==
The Search Center UI showing the local search results with federated search results on the right

MSS provided a search center interface to present the UI for querying. The interface was available as a web application, accessed using a browser. The query could either be a simple query, or use advanced operators as defined by the AQS syntax. The matched files were listed along with a snippet from the file, with the search terms highlighted, sorted by relevance. The relevance determination algorithm was developed by Microsoft Research and the team behind Windows Live Search (later Microsoft Bing). MSS also showed definitions of the search terms, where applicable, as well as suggesting corrections for misspelled terms. Duplicate results were collapsed together. Alerts could be set for specific queries, where the user was informed of changes to the results of a query via email or RSS. The search center UI used the ASP.NET web part infrastructure and could be customized using either Microsoft Visual Studio or Microsoft Office SharePoint Designer. Custom actions could be defined on a per-filetype basis as well.

MSS could index any data source as long as an indexing connector for the data source was provided. The indexing connector included protocol handlers, metadata handlers and iFilters to enumerate the data items in the source and extract metadata from the items in the data source. If the file type in the source had a corresponding iFilter, then it was used to extract the text of the file for full text indexing as well. The handlers and iFilters MSS used are the same as used by SharePoint, Microsoft SQL Server and Windows Search as well. The data sources that were to be indexed were identified by their URIs and had to be configured prior to indexing. The indexer updated the search index as soon as an item is indexed (continuous propagation) so that the items can be queried against even before the indexing crawl was complete. MSS could also federate searches to other search services (including SharePoint and web search servers) that supported the OpenSearch protocol. Federated locations could be serialized to a .fld file.

The administration UI, which was also presented as a web application, could be used to review statistics such as most frequent queries, top destination hits, click through rates etc., as well as fine tune relevancy settings, indexing policies (including inclusion and exclusion filters) and schedules, and set up a cluster of the servers. It could also be used to back up either the configuration state or the search indices. ACLs could also be defined to limit the search result according to the rights of the user initiating the query.
