= File Explorer =

Microsoft Windows file manager application

- File Explorer on Windows 11 in Light App Mode showing special folders on Home, with the new command bar and tabs feature
- Developer: Microsoft
- Release: August 15, 1995; 31 years ago
- Stable release: 26H1 (10.0.28000.3237) (October 26, 2026; 3 days ago) [±] 26H2 (10.0.26300.9725) (October 26, 2026; 3 days ago) [±]
- Preview release: Release Preview: 26H2 (10.0.26300.9725) (October 26, 2026; 3 days ago) [±]; Release Preview (26H1): (10.0.28000.3237) (October 26, 2026; 3 days ago) [±]; Beta: 25H2 (10.0.26220.9757) (October 23, 2026; 6 days ago) [±]; Beta (26H1): (10.0.28020.3292) (October 23, 2026; 6 days ago) [±]; Experimental: 26H2 (10.0.26340.9767) (October 23, 2026; 6 days ago) [±]; Experimental (26H1): (10.0.28120.3302) (October 23, 2026; 6 days ago) [±]; Experimental (Future Platforms): (10.0.29695.1001) (October 23, 2026; 6 days ago) [±]
- Included with: Windows 95 and later
- Predecessor: Program Manager, File Manager
- Type: Shell, file manager

File Explorer, previously known as Windows Explorer, named explorer.exe internally in Windows operating systems, is a file manager application and default desktop environment that is included with releases of the Microsoft Windows operating system from Windows 95 onwards. It provides a graphical user interface for accessing the file systems, as well as user interface elements such as the taskbar and desktop.

The application was renamed from "Windows Explorer" to "File Explorer" in Windows 8; however, the old name of "Windows Explorer" can still be seen in the Windows Task Manager.

== Overview ==
Windows Explorer was first included with Windows 95 as a replacement for File Manager, which came with all versions of Windows 3.x operating systems. Explorer could be accessed by double-clicking the new My Computer desktop icon or launched from the new Start Menu that replaced the earlier Program Manager. There is also a shortcut key combination: Windows key+E. Successive versions of Windows (and in some cases, Internet Explorer) introduced new features and capabilities, removed other features, and generally progressed from being a simple file system navigation tool into a task-based file management system.

While "Windows Explorer" or "File Explorer" is a term most commonly used to describe the file management aspect of the operating system, the Explorer process also houses the operating system's search functionality and File Type associations (based on filename extensions), and is responsible for displaying the desktop icons, the Start Menu, the Taskbar, and the Control Panel. Collectively, these features are known as the Windows shell.

File Explorer is the default user interface for accessing and managing the file systems, but it is possible to perform such tasks on Windows without File Explorer. For example, the File ▸ Run menu option in Task Manager on Windows NT or later functions independently of File Explorer, as do commands run within a command prompt window.

After a user logs in, the explorer process is created by the userinit process. Userinit performs some initialization of the user environment (such as running the login script and applying group policies) and then looks in the registry at the Shell value and creates a process to run the system-defined shell – by default, Explorer.exe. Then Userinit exits. This is why Explorer.exe is shown by various process explorers with no parent – its parent has exited.

== History ==
In 1995, Microsoft first released test versions of a shell refresh, named the Shell Technology Preview, and often referred to informally as "NewShell". The update was designed to replace the Windows 3.x Program Manager/File Manager based shell with Windows Explorer. The release provided capabilities quite similar to that of the Windows "Chicago" (codename for Windows 95) shell during its late beta phases, however was intended to be nothing more than a test release. There were two public releases of the Shell Technology Preview, made available to MSDN and CompuServe users: May 26, 1995, and August 8, 1995. Both held Windows Explorer builds of 3.51.1053.1. The Shell Technology Preview program never saw a final release under NT 3.51. The entire program was moved across to the Cairo development group who finally integrated the new shell design into the NT code with the release of NT 4.0 in July 1996.

=== Windows 98 and Windows Desktop Update ===
With the release of the Windows Desktop Update (packaged with Internet Explorer 4 as an optional component, and included in Windows 98), Windows Explorer became "integrated" with Internet Explorer, most notably with the addition of navigation arrows (back and forward) for moving between recently visited directories, as well as Internet Explorer's Favorites menu.

An address bar was also added to Windows Explorer, which a user could type in directory paths directly, and be taken to that folder.

Another feature that was based on Internet Explorer technology was customized folders. Such folders contained a hidden web page that controlled the way the Windows Explorer displayed the contents of the folder.

=== Windows Me and Windows 2000 ===
The integrated media player in Windows Explorer in Windows 2000, playing a MIDI sequence in Media folder

The "Web-style" folders view, with the left Explorer pane displaying details for the object currently selected, is turned on by default. For certain file types, such as pictures and media files, a preview is also displayed in the left pane. The Windows 2000 Explorer featured an interactive media player as the previewer for sound and video files. However, such a previewer can be enabled in Windows Me through the use of folder customization templates. Windows Explorer in Windows 2000 and Windows Me allows for custom thumbnail previewers and tooltip handlers. The default file tooltip displays file title, author, subject and comments; this metadata may be read from a special NTFS stream, if the file is on an NTFS volume, or from a COM Structured Storage stream, if the file is a structured storage document. All Microsoft Office documents since Office 95 make use of structured storage, so their metadata is displayable in the Windows 2000 Explorer default tooltip. File shortcuts can also store comments which are displayed as a tooltip when the mouse hovers over the shortcut.

The right-hand pane, which usually just lists files and folders, can also be customized. For example, the contents of the system folders aren't displayed by default, instead showing in the right pane a warning to the user that modifying the contents of the system folders could harm their computer. It's possible to define additional Explorer panes by using DIV elements in folder template files. This feature was abused by computer viruses that employed malicious scripts, Java applets, or ActiveX controls in folder template files as their infection vector. Two such viruses are VBS/Roor-C and VBS.Redlof.a.

Other Explorer UI elements that can be customized include columns in "Details" view, icon overlays, and search providers: the new DHTML-based search pane is integrated into Windows 2000 Explorer, unlike the separate search dialog found in all previous Explorer versions.

Search capabilities were added, offering full-text searches of documents, with options to filter by date (including arbitrary ranges like "modified within the last week"), size, and file type. The Indexing Service has also been integrated into the operating system and the search pane built into Explorer allows searching files indexed by its database. The ability to customize the standard buttons was also added.

=== Windows XP and Windows Server 2003 ===
Windows Explorer in Windows XP, showing All Users folder contents

There were significant changes made to Windows Explorer in Windows XP, both visually and functionally. Microsoft focused especially on making Explorer more discoverable and task-based, as well as adding several new features to reflect the growing use of a computer as a digital hub.

Windows Explorer in Windows Server 2003 contains all the same features as Windows XP, but the task panes and search companion are disabled by default.

==== Task pane ====
The task pane is displayed on the left-hand side of the window instead of the traditional folder tree view. It presents the user with a list of common actions and destinations that are relevant to the current directory or file(s) selected. For instance, when in a directory containing mostly pictures, a set of "Picture tasks" is shown, offering the options to display these pictures as a slide show, to print them out, or to go online to order prints. Conversely, a folder containing music files would offer options to play those files in a media player or to go online to purchase music. Windows XP had a Media bar but it was removed with SP1. The Media Bar was only available with Windows XP RTM.

Every folder also has "File and Folder Tasks", offering options to create new folders, share a folder on the local network, publish files or folders to a website, and other common tasks like copying, renaming, moving, and deleting files or folders. File types that have identified themselves as being printable also have an option listed to print the file.

Underneath "Other Places" is a "Details" pane which gives additional information – typically file size and date, but depending on the file type, a thumbnail preview, author, image dimensions, or other details.

The "Folders" button on the Windows Explorer toolbar toggles between the traditional tree view of folders, and the task pane. Users can get rid of the task pane or restore it using the sequence: Tools – Folder Options – General – Show Common Tasks/Use Windows Classic Folders.

==== Search companion ====
Windows Explorer's default Search Companion, Rover, in Windows XP

Microsoft introduced animated "Search Companions" in an attempt to make searching more engaging and friendly; the default character is a puppy named Rover (previously used in Microsoft Bob), with three other characters (Merlin the magician, Earl the surfer, and Courtney) also available. These search companions use the same technology as Microsoft Office's Office Assistants, even incorporating "tricks" and sound effects, and they can be used as Office Assistants if their files are copied into the C:\Windows\msagent\chars folder.

The search capability itself is fairly similar to Windows Me and Windows 2000, with one major addition: Search can also be instructed to search only files that are categorical "Documents" or "Pictures, music and video"; this feature is noteworthy largely because of how Windows determines what types of files can be classified under these categories. In order to maintain a relevant list of file types, Windows Explorer connects to Microsoft and downloads a set of XML files that define what these file types are. The Search Companion can be disabled in favor of the classic search pane used in Windows 2000 by using the Tweak UI applet from Microsoft's PowerToys for Windows XP, or by manually editing the registry.

==== Image handling ====
Folder thumbnail preview icon on Windows XP

Windows XP improves image preview in Explorer by offering a Filmstrip view. "Back" and "Previous" buttons facilitate navigation through the pictures, and a pair of "Rotate" buttons offer 90-degree clockwise and counter-clockwise (lossy) rotation of images. Aside from the Filmstrip view mode, there is a 'Thumbnails' mode, which displays thumbnail-sized images in the folder. A Folder containing images will also show thumbnails of four of the images from that folder overlaid on top of a large folder icon.

==== Web publishing ====
Web sites that offer image hosting services can be plugged into Windows Explorer, which the user can use to select images on their computer, and have them uploaded correctly without dealing with comparatively complex solutions involving FTP or web interfaces.

==== Other changes ====
- Explorer gained the ability to understand the metadata of a number of types of files. For example, with images from a digital camera, the Exif information can be viewed, both in the Properties pages for the photo itself, as well as via optional additional Details View columns.
- A Tile view mode was added, which displays the file's icon in a larger size (48 × 48), and places the file name, descriptive type, and additional information (typically the file size for data files, and the publisher name for applications) to the right.
- The Details view also presented an additional option called "Show in Groups" which allows the Explorer to separate its contents by headings based on the field which is used to sort the items.
- The taskbar can be locked to prevent it from accidentally being moved.
- Windows Explorer also gained the ability to burn CDs and DVD-RAM discs in Windows XP.
- Ability to create and open ZIP files, called "compressed folders", which is a file containing other files.
- Ability to open Cabinet (.cab) files, another type of file that contains other files.
- If a .HTM or .HTML file is copied or moved, the accompanying _files suffix folder is copied or moved among it automatically.

ZIP and CAB files are integrated into the user interface so they can be browsed as if they were ordinary folders. Given that files contained inside ZIP files can not be opened directly, they are automatically extracted to a temporary location and launched with the associated program from the temporary location when opened, to make the appearance that the ZIP file is a real directory.

==== Removed and changed features ====
- The sort order has changed compared to the one in Windows 2000. For file names containing numbers Windows Explorer now tries to sort based on numerical value rather than just comparing each number digit by digit.

=== Windows Vista and Windows Server 2008 ===
Windows Explorer in Windows Vista, showing Public folder contents

==== Search, organizing and metadata ====
Windows Explorer includes significant changes from previous versions of Windows such as improved filtering, sorting, grouping and stacking. Combined with integrated desktop search, Windows Explorer allows users to find and organize their files in new ways, such as stacks. The new Stacks viewing mode groups files according to the criterion specified by the user. Stacks can be clicked to filter the files shown in Windows Explorer. There is also the ability to save searches as virtual folders or search folders. A search folder is simply an XML file, which stores the query in a form that can be used by the Windows search subsystem. When accessed, the search is executed and the results are aggregated and presented as a virtual folder. Windows Vista includes six search folders by default: recent documents, recent e-mail, recent music, recent pictures and videos, recent changed, and "Shared by Me". Additionally, search operators for properties were introduced, such as kind:music. Since at least Windows 7, comparison operators "greater than" and "less than" are supported to search for any supported attribute such as date ranges and file sizes, like size:>100MB to search for all files that are greater than 100 MB. Attributes sortable and searchable in Windows Explorer include pictures' dimensions, Exif data such as aperture and exposure, video duration and framerate and width.

When sorting items, the sort order no longer remains consistently Ascending or Descending. Each property has a preferred sort direction. For example, sort by date defaults to descending order, as does size. But name and type default to ascending order.

Searching for files containing a given text string became problematic with Vista unless the files had been indexed. An alternative is to use the findstr command-line function. After right-clicking on a folder one can open a command-line prompt in that folder.

Windows Explorer also contains modifications in the visualization of files on a computer. A new addition to Windows Explorer in Vista and Server 2008 is the details pane, which displays metadata and information relating to the currently selected file or folder. The details pane will also display a thumbnail of the file or an icon of the filetype if the file does not contain visual information. Furthermore, different imagery is overlaid on thumbnails to give more information about the file, such as a picture frame around the thumbnail of an image file, or a filmstrip on a video file.

The details pane in Windows Vista and Windows Server 2008 showing metadata of an image

The details pane also allows for the change of some textual metadata such as author and title in files that support them within Windows Explorer. A new type of metadata called tags allows users to add descriptive terms to documents for easier categorization and retrieval. Some files support open metadata, allowing users to define new types of metadata for their files. Out-of-the-box, Windows Vista and Windows Server 2008 supports Microsoft Office documents and most audio and video files. Support for other file types can however be added by writing specialized software to retrieve the metadata at the shell's request. Metadata stored in a file's alternate data stream only on NTFS volumes cannot be viewed and edited through the summary tab of the file's properties anymore. Instead, all metadata is stored inside the file, so that it will always travel with the file and not be dependent on the file system.

==== Layout and icons ====
Windows Explorer in Windows Vista and Windows Server 2008 also introduces a new layout. The task panes from Windows XP are replaced with a toolbar on top and a navigation pane on the left. The navigation pane contains commonly accessed folders and preconfigured search folders. Eight different views are available to view files and folders, including extra large, large, medium, small, list, details, tiles, and content. In addition, column headers now appear in all icon viewing modes, unlike Windows XP where they only appear in the details icon viewing mode. File and folder actions such as cut, copy, paste, undo, redo, delete, rename and properties are built into a dropdown menu which appears when the Organize button is clicked. It is also possible to change the layout of the Explorer window by using the Organize button. Users can select whether to display classic menus, a search pane, a preview pane, a reading pane, and the navigation pane. The preview pane enables users to preview files (e.g., documents or media files) without opening them. If an application, such as Office 2007, installs preview handlers for file types, then these files can also be edited within the preview pane itself.

Windows Vista saw the introduction of the breadcrumb bar for easier navigation. As opposed to the prior address bar which displayed the current folder in a simple editable combobox, this new style structures the path into clickable levels of folder hierarchy (though falls back to the classic edit mode when a blank area is clicked), enabling the user to skip as many levels as desired in one click rather than repeatedly clicking "Up". It is also possible to navigate to any subfolder of the current folder using the arrow to the right of the last item. The menu bar is now hidden by default but reappears temporarily when the user presses Alt.

Check boxes in Windows Explorer allow the selection of multiple files. Free and used space on all drives is shown in horizontal indicator bars. Icons of various sizes are supported: 16 x 16, 24 x 24, 32 x 32, 48 x 48, 64 x 64, 96 x 96, 128 x 128 and 256 x 256. Windows Explorer can zoom the icons in and out using a slider or by holding down the Ctrl key and using the mouse scrollwheel. Live icons can display the content of folders and files themselves rather than generic icons.

==== Other changes ====
With the release of Windows Vista and Server 2008 and Windows Internet Explorer 7 for Windows XP, Internet Explorer is no longer integrated with Windows Explorer. In Windows Vista and Server 2008 (and in Windows XP as well if IE7 or 8 is installed), Windows Explorer no longer displays web pages, and IE7 does not support use as a file manager, although one will separately launch the other as necessary.

When moving or copying files from one folder to another, if two files have the same name, an option is now available to rename the file; in previous versions of Windows, the user was prompted to choose either a replacement or cancel moving the file. Also, when renaming a file, Explorer only highlights the filename without selecting the extension. Renaming multiple files is quicker as pressing Tab automatically renames the existing file or folder and opens the file name text field for the next file for renaming. Shift+Tab allows renaming in the same manner upwards.

Support for burning data on DVDs (DVD±R, DVD±R DL, DVD±R RW) in addition to CDs and DVD-RAM using version 2.0 of the Image Mastering API, as well as Live File System support was added.

If a file is in use by another application, Windows Explorer tells users to close the application and retry the file operation. Also, a new interface IFileIsInUse is introduced into the API which developers can use to let other applications switch to the main window of the application that has the file open or simply close the file from the "File in Use" dialog. If the running application exposes these operations by means of the IFileIsInUse interface, Windows Explorer, upon encountering a locked file, allows the user to close the file or switch to the application from the dialog box itself.

Windows Vista introduced pre-included support for the Media Transfer Protocol.

==== Removed and changed features ====
The ability to customize the layout and buttons on the toolbars has been removed in Windows Vista's Explorer, as has the ability to add a password to a zip file (compressed folder). The Toolbar button in Explorer to go up one folder from the current folder has been removed (the function still exists however, one can move up a folder by pressing Alt + ↑). Although still fully available from the menus and keyboard shortcuts, toolbar buttons for Cut, Copy, Paste, Undo, Delete, Properties and some others are no longer available. The Menu Bar is also hidden by default but is still available by pressing the Alt key or changing its visibility in the layout options. Several other features are removed such as showing the size on the status bar without selecting items, storing metadata in NTFS alternate data streams, the IColumnProvider interface which allowed addition of custom columns to Explorer and folder background customization using desktop.ini.

The ability to right-click a folder and hit "Search" was removed in Windows Vista Service Pack 1. Users must open the folder they wish to search in and enter their keywords in the search field located on the top right corner of the window. Alternatively, users can specify other search parameters through the "Advanced Search" UI, which can be accessed by clicking on the Organize Bar and selecting Search Pane under the Layout submenu. Pressing F3 also opens the "Advanced Search" interface.

=== Windows 7 and Windows Server 2008 R2 ===
Windows Explorer in Windows 7, showing Libraries

==== Libraries ====
Windows Explorer in Windows 7 and Windows Server 2008 R2 supports libraries, virtual folders described in a .library-ms file that aggregates content from various locations – including shared folders on networked systems if the shared folder has been indexed by the host system – and present them in a unified view. Searching in a library automatically federates the query to the remote systems, in addition to searching on the local system, so that files on the remote systems are also searched. Unlike search folders, Libraries are backed by a physical location which allows files to be saved in the libraries. Such files are transparently saved in the backing physical folder. The default save location for a library may be configured by the user, as can the default view layout for each library. Libraries are generally stored in the libraries special folder, which allows them to be displayed on the navigation pane.

By default, a new user account in Windows 7 contains four libraries, for different file types: Documents, Music, Pictures, and Videos. They are configured to include the user's profile folders for these respective file types, as well as the computer's corresponding Public folders.

In addition to aggregating multiple storage locations, Libraries enable Arrangement Views and Search Filter Suggestions. Arrangement Views allow users to pivot their views of the library's contents based on metadata. For example, selecting the "By Month" view in the Pictures library will display photos in stacks, where each stack represents a month of photos based on the date they were taken. In the Music library, the "By Artist" view will display stacks of albums from the artists in their collections, and browsing into an artist stack will then display the relevant albums.

Search Filter Suggestions are a new feature of the Windows 7 and Windows Server 2008 R2 Explorer's search box. When the user clicks in the search box, a menu shows up below it showing recent searches as well as suggested Advanced Query Syntax filters that the user can type. When one is selected (or typed in manually), the menu will update to show the possible values to filter by for that property, and this list is based on the current location and other parts of the query already typed. For example, selecting the "tags" filter or typing "tags:" into the search box will display the list of possible tag values which will return search results.

The metadata written within the file, implemented in Vista, is also utilized in Windows 7. This can sometimes lead to long wait times displaying the contents of a folder. For example, if a folder contains many large video files totaling hundreds of gigabytes, and the Window Explorer pane is in Details view mode showing a property contained within the metadata (for example Date, Length, Frame Height), Windows Explorer might have to search the contents of the whole file for the meta data. Some damaged files can cause a prolonged delay as well. This is due to metadata information being able to be placed anywhere within the file, beginning, middle, or end, necessitating a search of the whole file. Lengthy delays also occur when displaying the contents of a folder with many different types of program icons. The icon is contained in the metadata. Some programs cause the activation of a virus scan when retrieving the icon information from the metadata, hence producing a lengthy delay.

Arrangement Views and Search Filter Suggestions are database-backed features that require that all locations in the Library be indexed by the Windows Search service. Local disk locations must be indexed by the local indexer, and Windows Explorer will automatically add locations to the indexing scope when they are included in a library. Remote locations can be indexed by the indexer on another Windows 7 and Windows Server 2008 R2 machine, on a Windows machine running Windows Search 4 (such as Windows Vista or Windows Home Server), or on another device that implements the MS-WSP remote query protocol.

==== Federated search ====
Windows Explorer also supports federating search to external data sources, such as custom databases or web services, that are exposed over the web and described via an OpenSearch definition. The federated location description (called a Search Connector) is provided as a .osdx file. Once installed, the data source becomes queryable directly from Windows Explorer. Windows Explorer features, such as previews and thumbnails, work with the results of a federated search as well.

==== Other changes ====
- Windows 7 and Windows Server 2008 R2 support showing icons in the context menu and creating cascaded context menus with static verbs in submenus using the Registry instead of a shell extension.
- The search box in the Explorer window and the address bar can be resized.
- Certain folders in the navigation pane can be hidden to reduce clutter.
- Progress bars and overlay icons on an application's button on the taskbar.
- Content view which shows thumbnails and metadata.
- Buttons to toggle the preview pane and create a new folder.

==== Removed or changed features ====
In Windows 7, several features have been removed from Windows Explorer, including the collapsible folder pane, overlay icon for shared items, remembering individual folder window sizes and positions, free disk space on the status bar, icons on the command bar, ability to disable Auto Arrange and Align to Grid, sortable column headings in other views except details view, ability to disable full row selection in details view, automatic horizontal scrolling and scrollbar in the navigation pane and maintaining selection when sorting from the Edit menu.

=== Windows 8 and Windows Server 2012 ===
The new File Explorer with ribbon in Windows 8

The file manager on Windows 8 and Windows Server 2012 is renamed File Explorer and introduces new features such as a redesigned interface incorporating a ribbon toolbar, and a redesigned file operation dialog that displays more detailed progress and allows for file operations to be paused and resumed. The details pane from Windows Vista and 7 was removed and replaced with a narrower pane with no icons and fewer detail columns. But other details are displayed by hovering over the file's name.

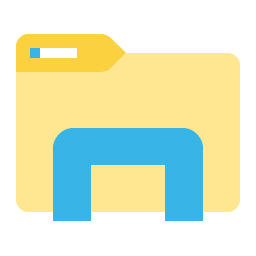
File Explorer icon in Windows 10 version 1607 to version 1903

=== Windows 10 and Windows Server 2016 ===
File Explorer's icons were redesigned to fit with the more flat and simplified theming of Windows 10 as a whole. The window border padding is thinner than previous versions. Windows 10 Creators Update and later versions come with a new Universal File Explorer (also known as the UWP File Explorer). Although hidden, it can be opened by creating a shortcut pointing to "explorer shell:AppsFolder\c5e2524a-ea46-4f67-841f-6a9465d9d515_cw5n1h2txyewy!App" A Dark mode was added to the software in 2018, to match similar themes available for other inbuilt Windows applications.

=== Windows 10, version 1809 and Windows Server 2019 ===
Dark mode support was added to File Explorer in Windows 10, version 1809 and Windows Server 2019. The Universal File Explorer also includes new features.

=== Windows 10, version 1909 ===
Windows Search and OneDrive have been integrated into File Explorer's search feature in Windows 10, version 1909.

=== Windows 11 ===
In Windows 11, File Explorer had undergone significant UI changes, with the Ribbon Interface dating back to Windows 8 having been reworked into a command bar. Translucency, shadows, and rounded geometry have also been added, following the Microsoft's new Fluent Design System. In March 2022, Microsoft introduced adverts into File Explorer, but later stated that these were "not intended to be published externally" after significant negative media coverage.

=== Windows 11 2022 Update ===
On April 5, 2022, Microsoft announced that it would be adding tabs, favorites, and a new homepage to File Explorer. These features were eventually introduced via an update to the Windows 11 2022 Update on October 18, 2022.

=== Windows 11 2023 Update ===
On September 21, 2023, Microsoft announced a redesigned File Explorer home page, address bar, search box, details pane, and Gallery view. The features were first distributed to many Windows 11 22H2 systems through cumulative updates and were then included in Windows 11 23H2, which used an enablement package to activate features already present on updated 22H2 devices. Microsoft also listed File Explorer tabs among the features included in 23H2.

== Extensibility ==
File Explorer can be extended to support non-default functionality by means of Windows shell extensions, which are COM objects that plug the extended functionality into Windows Explorer. Shell extensions can be in the form of shell extension handlers, toolbars or even namespace extensions that allow certain folders (or even non-filesystem objects such as the images scanned by a scanner) to be presented as a special folder. File Explorer also allows metadata for files to be added as NTFS alternate data streams, separate from the data stream for the file.

Shell extension handlers are queried by the shell beforehand for modifying the action the shell takes. They can be associated on a per file type – where they will show up only when a particular action takes place on a particular file type – or on a global basis – which are always available. The shell supports the following extension handlers:

Handler	Description	Can be implemented on	Required shell version
Context menu handler	Adds menu items to the context menu. It is called before the context menu is displayed.	Per file type	Windows 95 and later. Windows 7 introduced IExecuteCommand
Drag-and-drop handler	Controls the action upon right-click drag and drop and modifies the context menu that appears.	Global	Windows 95 and later
Drop target handler	Controls the action after a data object is dragged and dropped over a drop target such as a file.	Per file type	Windows 95 and later
Data object handler	Controls the action after a file is copied to the clipboard or dragged and dropped over a drop target. It can provide additional clipboard formats to the drop target.	Per file type	Windows 95 and later
Icon handler	Assigns a custom icon to an individual file amongst a class of file types. It is called before file icons are displayed.	Per file type	Windows 95 and later
Property sheet handler	Replaces or adds pages to the property sheet dialog box of an object.	Per file type	Windows 95 and later
Copy hook handler	Allows running, modifying or denying the action when a user or application tries to copy, move, delete, or rename an object.	Not associated with a file type	Windows 95 and later
Search handler	Allows shell integration of a custom search engine.	Not associated with a file type	Windows 95 through Windows XP
Infotip handler	Allows retrieving flags and infotip information for an item and displaying it inside a popup tooltip upon mouse hover.	Per file type	Windows Desktop Update and later
Thumbnail image handler	Provides for a thumbnail image to be generated and displayed along with its alpha type when a file is selected or the thumbnail view is activated.	Per file type	Windows Desktop Update and later. Windows Vista introduced a newer IThumbnailProvider interface that also shows thumbnails in the Details pane. The older IExtractImage is still supported but not in the Details pane.
Disk Cleanup handler	Add a new entry to the Disk Cleanup application and allows specifying additional disk locations or files to clean up.	Per folder	Windows 98 and later
Column handler	Allows creating and displaying custom columns in Windows Explorer details view. It can be used to extend sorting and grouping.	Per folder	Windows 2000 and later
Icon overlay handler	Allows displaying an overlay icon over a shell object (a file or folder icon).	Per file type	Windows 2000 and later
Metadata handler	Allows viewing and modifying metadata stored in a file. It can be used to extend details view columns, infotips, property pages, sorting and grouping.	Per file type	Windows 2000 and later
Filter handler (IFilter)	Allows file properties and its contents to be indexed and searched by Indexing Service or Windows Search	Per file type	Windows 2000 and later
AutoPlay handler	Examines newly discovered removable media and devices and, based on content such as pictures, music or video files, launches an appropriate application to play or display the content.	Per file type category Windows XP only: per device and per file type category	Windows XP and later
Property handler	Allows viewing and modifying system-defined and custom properties of a file.	Per file type	Windows Vista and later; on Windows XP if Windows Search is installed.
Preview handler	Renders enhanced previews of items without launching the default application when a file is selected. It can also provide file type-specific navigation such as browsing a document, or seeking inside a media file.	Per file type	Windows Vista and later

Namespace extensions are used by Explorer and Common Dialogs to either display some data – which are not necessarily persisted as files – in a folder-like view or to present data in a way that is different from their organization on the file system. This feature can be used by any hierarchical data source that can be represented as a file system, including Cloud-based data sources. Special folders, such as My Computer and Network Places in Windows Explorer are implemented this way, as are Explorer views that let items in a mobile phone or digital camera be explored. Source-control systems that use Explorer to browse source repositories also use Namespace extensions to allow Explorer to browse the revisions. To implement a namespace extension, the IPersistFolder, IShellView, IShellFolder, IShellBrowser and IOleWindow interfaces need to be implemented and registered. The implementation needs to provide the logic for navigating the data store as well as describing the presentation. Windows Explorer will instantiate the COM objects as required.

While Windows Explorer natively exposes the extensibility points as COM interfaces, .NET Framework can also be used to write some types of extensions, using the COM Interop functionality of .NET Framework. While Microsoft itself makes available extensions – such as the photo info tool – which are authored using .NET Framework, they currently recommend against writing managed shell extensions, as only one instance of the CLR (prior to version 4.0) can be loaded per-process. This behavior will cause conflicts if multiple managed add-ins, targeting different versions of the CLR, are attempted to be run simultaneously.

== See also ==
- Comparison of file managers
- List of alternative shells for Windows
