= Classic Shell =

Windows computer program

- Developer: Ivo Beltchev
- Release: 29 November 2009; 16 years ago
- Final release: 4.3.1 / 12 August 2017; 8 years ago
- Written in: C++
- Operating system: Windows 7, Windows 8, Windows 8.1, Windows 10, Windows Server 2008 R2, Windows Server 2012, Windows Server 2012 R2
- Available in: English and other
- Type: Shell
- License: MIT License
- Website: classicshell.net
- Repository: github.com/Open-Shell/Open-Shell-Menu

Classic Shell is a computer program for Microsoft Windows that provides user interface elements intended to restore familiar features from past versions of Windows. It focuses on the Start menu, File Explorer and Internet Explorer – three major components of the Windows shell although it also does some minor tweaks for the Windows Taskbar. In particular, it can serve as a Start menu replacement for Windows 8 and Windows 10 systems.

Developed by Ivo Beltchev, it was first released in 2009, and has been downloaded nearly 40 million times by the end of 2024.

Development by Beltchev has ceased, and the project's source code has been released. Development has been picked up by volunteers on GitHub under the name Open-Shell.

== Features and architecture ==
Classic Shell is packaged as a suite of three components, all optional and independent of each other:

- Classic Start Menu – A re-implementation of the Start Menu, replicating features from several different generations of Windows
- Classic Explorer – An add-on to File/Windows Explorer, restoring and extending features present in various Windows releases
- Classic IE – An add-on for Internet Explorer 9 and later, it restores the web page title to the window title bar, and various details to the status bar

Classic Shell is programmed in C++. Although it modifies Windows behaviors, it does not do so by modifying or tweaking Windows registry settings or replacing or patching system files – all modifications are done using Windows APIs. It is localized into more than 30 languages, including right-to-left support for Arabic and Hebrew.

=== Classic Start Menu ===
Classic Start Menu is a replacement for the Windows Start Menu. Features include:

- Customize appearance of the Start button and Start Menu, and menu and submenu items
- Show recently, or most frequently used, apps
- Show recently opened documents, with sorting, jumplists, and pinning
- Highlight newly installed programs
- Separate traditional desktop apps from Universal Windows Platform apps
- Sort menus alphabetically, by date, or custom order with drag-and-drop
- Windows Search integration
- Customize settings such as menu opening delay, tooltip timing, sub-menu column style, menu width, icon size, animation, scroll speed, font smoothing, etc.
- Skinning to more completely customize the appearance
- Scales icons and menu background to higher resolutions and/or pixel density (PPI)

Besides restoring past behavior, there are several new features. These include showing the menu next to the taskbar when it is vertical, multi-monitor support, launching multiple programs at once, custom shutdown-related actions, Universal app launching, expanding any file folder as cascading menus, and additional keyboard shortcuts. The search box can search the system path, can show partial matches, and can show all results inside the menu.

Classic Start Menu can also modify Windows 8's new UI features, such as hot corners only on the desktop without disabling them inside Universal apps.

=== Classic Explorer ===
Classic Explorer is an add-on to Windows File Explorer, implemented as various shell extensions. It does not replace EXPLORER.EXE. Features include:

- A toolbar that can include built-in commands, custom commands, or dropdown menus for arbitrary folders.
- Customize the behavior and appearance of the left folder navigation pane, including whether folders expand with a single click or double click, connecting lines, subfolder indicators, horizontal scrollbar, tree item spacing, and keyboard shortcuts
- The breadcrumb bar can be replaced with a traditional address bar, and the associated dropdown modified to show the hierarchical path instead of recent folder history
- Sort headers in all views
- Overlay icon for network shares
- Status bar can show disk free space, total size of current folder
- Tooltip of selected item
- "Up" button for navigating to the parent folder
- Show the current folder in the title bar caption
- Copy progress dialog can be automatically expanded to show more details
- Replace the copy conflict dialog with one like Windows XP

== History ==
Classic Shell began as a tool for personal use, and saw its first public release in 2009. Over time, the Start Menu component evolved to be a customizable launcher that also integrated a search box and other features of the Windows 7 Start Menu. The Explorer and IE components appeared later.

While earlier versions were compatible with Windows Vista and later, versions since 3.9.0 no longer support Windows Vista/Server 2008. Classic Shell was never popular or necessary on Vista in the first place because Vista, like XP, came with the ability to revert to a classic start menu.

Classic Shell is released as free and open-source under the MIT License.

Founder Ivo Beltchev announced the end of development in December 2017.

=== Open-Shell ===
Since 2018, Classic Shell has been developed as an open source program under the name Open-Shell. Open-Shell has remained functionally similar to Classic Shell, but it has added some small features and addressed several bugs, many caused by new versions of Windows. Some of the changes in Open-Shell include:

- Options for changing Start menu position and alignment
- Support for jump lists on UWP apps
- Partial support for Windows 11
- New skins and updated logo and artwork

Like Classic Shell, Open-Shell is released under the MIT License. The latest stable version, 4.4.198, dates from 12 May 2026.

== Reception ==
Classic Shell was a fairly popular interface enhancement in the Windows 7 life cycle but became much more widely used after the release and negative reception of Windows 8 (with its lack of a Start menu).

It has seen coverage in such publications as Lifehacker, Neowin, Ghacks, ZDNet, PC World, TechRepublic, MakeUseOf, and Betanews.

== See also ==
- Comparison of Start menu replacements for Windows 8
- List of alternative shells for Windows
