= List of alternative shells for Windows =

This is a list of software that provides an alternative graphical user interface for Microsoft Windows operating systems. The technical term for this interface is a shell. Windows' standard user interface is the Windows shell; Windows 3.0 and Windows 3.1 have a different shell, called Program Manager. The programs in this list do not restyle the Windows shell, but replace it; therefore, they look and function differently, and have different configuration options.

Shell	Software license	Windows versions									Development status
Shell	Software license	3.1	9x	2000	XP	Vista	7	8	10	11	Development status
Blackbox	GPL	No	No	No	Yes	Yes	Yes	Yes	Yes	Yes	Stalled
BumpTop	Apache License	No	No	No	Yes	Yes	Yes	Yes	Yes	Yes	Discontinued
Cairo Shell	Apache License	No	No	No	No	No	Yes	Yes	Yes	Yes	Active
Calmira	GPL	Yes	No	No	No	No	No	No	No	No	Discontinued
Central Point Desktop	Proprietary	Yes	No	No	No	No	No	No	No	No	Discontinued
Classic Shell	Proprietary	No	No	No	No	No	Yes	Yes	Yes	No	Discontinued
Emerge Desktop	GPL	No	No	Yes	Yes	Yes	Yes	No	No	No	Discontinued
GlazeWM	GPL	No	No	No	No	No	Yes	Yes	Yes	Yes	Active
LDE(X)	GPL	No	No	Yes	Yes	No	No	No	No	No	Discontinued
LiteStep	GPL	No	Yes	Yes	Yes	Yes	Yes	Yes	Yes	No	Stalled
Norton Desktop	Proprietary	Yes	No	No	No	No	No	No	No	No	Discontinued
Open-Shell	MIT License	No	No	No	No	No	Yes	Yes	Yes	Yes	Active
Packard Bell Navigator	Proprietary	Yes	Yes	No	No	No	No	No	No	No	Discontinued
NewWave	Proprietary	Yes	No	No	No	No	No	No	No	No	Discontinued
Program Manager II	MIT License	No	No	No	No	Yes	Yes	Yes	Yes	Yes	Stalled
SharpEnviro	GPL	No	No	No	Yes	Yes	Yes	No	No	No	Discontinued
SwineWM	MIT License	No	No	No	No	No	Yes	Yes	Yes	Yes	Active
TabWorks	Proprietary	Yes	No	No	No	No	No	No	No	No	Discontinued
Talisman Desktop	Trialware	No	Yes	Yes	Yes	Yes	Yes	Yes	Yes	No	Stalled
Xerox Rooms	Proprietary	Yes	No	No	No	No	No	No	No	No	Discontinued

== See also ==
- Comparison of Start menu replacements for Windows 8
- Comparison of X Window System desktop environments
- Desktop environment
- History of the graphical user interface
- Microsoft Bob
- Removal of Internet Explorer
