= Windows system =

In computing, Windows system may refer to:

- A Windows box, a computer running Microsoft Windows
- A windowing system, a type of software used to display graphical windows
- Microsoft Windows, an operating system
