= Comparison of Start menu replacements for Windows 8 =

Microsoft's Windows 8 operating system introduced an updated Start menu known as the "Start screen", which uses a full-screen design consisting of tiles to represent applications. This replaced the Windows desktop as the primary interface of the operating system. Additionally, the on-screen Start button was replaced by a hidden button in the corner of the screen; Microsoft explained that the Start button was removed because few people used it, noting the addition of "pinning" apps to the taskbar from Windows 7.

The change was controversial among users, and a market ensued for applications which restore the visible Start button, emulate the previous Start menu design, or allow users to boot directly to the Desktop instead of the Start screen.

The following is a list of Start menu replacements for Windows 8 which have received coverage from third-party sources:

Name	Developer	License	Skins	Run	Pinning	Aero	Sort	Boot to desktop	Notes
BringBack	Revel Software	Discontinued	?	?	?	?	?	?	Discontinued (http://www.majorgeeks.com/files/details/revel_bringback8.html)
Classic Shell	Classic Shell team	MIT License	10+extensible	Yes	Yes	Yes	Yes	Yes	Allows Modern UI related tweaks Discontinued and forked to Open-Shell
Classic Start 8	Crawler, LLC	Freeware	No	Yes	?	?	?	?	
Classic Windows Start Menu	SourceCodeBoy	CC-BY-NC-ND (Freeware for non-commercial use only)	Yes	Yes	No	Yes	Yes	Yes	Discontinued (last version here http://www.pypa.es/Utilidades/Software/)
Ex7forW8	Tihiy	Freeware	?	?	?	?	?	?	Discontinued (http://tihiy.net/files/ex7forW8_1.0.zip)
Finalbird	Svyatoslav Yudin	Freeware	No	Yes	Yes	No	Yes	Yes	Favorites of Start Menu is unified with the other software parts
Handy Start Menu	ChemTable Software	Freeware	?	?	?	?	?	?	
Open-Shell	?	MIT	Yes	?	?	?	?	Yes	Fork of Classic Shell
Pokki	SweetLabs, Inc.	Freeware	No	?	?	?	?	Yes	
Power8	Power8 Team	GNU General Public License	?	?	?	?	?	?	
RetroUI Pro	Thinix	Trialware	?	?	?	?	?	?	
Samsung Quick Starter	Samsung	?	?	?	?	?	?	?	
Start Menu 8	IObit	Trialware	?	?	No	?	?	Yes	
Start Menu Reviver	ReviverSoft	Freeware	?	?	?	?	?	Yes	touch screen support
Start Menu X	OrdinarySoft	Freemium	?	?	?	?	?	?	
Start8	Stardock Corporation	Trialware	Yes	Yes	Yes	?	?	Yes	
StartFinity	WinAbility Software	Freemium	?	?	?	?	?	Yes	Supports automatic localization of Start menu
StartIsBack	Пуск Будет Удобнее	Trialware	4+	Yes	Yes	?	?	Yes	modifies existing hot corners
StartMenuPlus8	Winok	Trialware	?	?	?	?	?	?	
StartW8	SODATSW	Freeware	?	?	?	?	?	?	
SyMenu	UGMFree	Freeware	6	?	Yes	?	Yes	Yes	The menu is fully portable
Tweaks.com Start for Windows 8	Advanced PC Media	Freeware	?	?	?	?	?	?	
ViStart	Lee-Soft	Ad-supported	Yes	Yes	Yes	No	?	Yes	
Wentutu Start Menu	Wentutu	?	?	?	?	?	?	?	
Win8StartButton	Torch Media Inc.	?	?	?	?	?	?	?	
Win8Starter	Engelmann Media GmbH	?	?	?	?	?	?	?	
Xeesa 1b QuickStart	Xeesa Services	Freemium	No	?	?	?	?	?	Cloud Start Menu available

The number of skins in the table givens the number of built-in skins. If there are downloadable skins, then a "+" is appended to the number to indicate that download extensions are possible.

RetroUI, StartIsBack, Classic Shell, Start8, and Pokki are five of the more notable of these. RetroUI is offered in 33 languages, and also for Windows Server 2012, and adds a taskbar and resizable windows. StartIsBack is also localized. Classic Shell used to be free and open source (now proprietary freeware), major items are localized and installing the Language Pack from Windows Update makes all items fully localized; Classic Shell is also available for Windows 7 and Windows Server, and claims over 25 million downloads. The Pokki download to restore the Start menu is free; as of January 2013, it has about 1.5 million users. The Pokki application platform, based on Chromium, enables desktop applications to be built—like mobile apps—using standard web languages like HTML5, CSS3, and JavaScript. It is also available for Windows XP and Windows 7. Pokki has raised $21.5M from investors like Google, Intel, and O'Reilly; its business model is to make a commission on software sold through its app store. Start8 has been downloaded over 5 million times.

== See also ==
- List of alternative shells for Windows
