= Calmira =

- Calmira running in Windows 3.1, showing the added Start menu
- Developer: Li-Hsin Huang
- Stable release: 3.31 / October 15, 2003; 23 years ago
- Operating system: Windows 3.1; OS/2 Warp
- Type: Shell
- License: GNU General Public License
- Website: www.calmira.de
- Repository: www.calmira.de/downloads/

Calmira (originally released as Calmira II) is an alternative shell for Windows 3.1x that replaces its shell with one resembling that of Windows 95. The original version of Calmira was developed by Li-Hsin Huang. Released under the GNU GPL, it has received a number of forks over the years by other developers seeking to update its functionality.

The shell is more than a simple cosmetic upgrade, however. Much of the functionality of later 32-bit shells has been incorporated into the Calmira software. The shell has a Start menu, a taskbar and a desktop that all function like those found in the Explorer-based desktop environments of later 32-bit Windows operating systems, including support for shortcuts and the Recycle Bin. The software also works under OS/2 Warp, IBM's competitor to Windows, giving that operating system a Start menu on top of other Windows-exclusive GUI features.

== Development ==
The Calmira shell was originally developed by Li-Hsin Huang. He wrote the software in Borland Delphi 1.0, an Object Pascal–based programming environment by Borland Software. Because the Windows 3.1x environment is virtually extinct as of 2023, additions of new features and addons to Calmira are few and far between.

== Source code ==
The source code for the Calmira shell is publicly available under the GNU GPL license, thus allowing software developers to participate in the project. However, as the Calmira shell was initially developed on the 16-bit Delphi 1.0 programming environment, active contributors are more or less restricted to developing the shell on that platform. An attempt to port parts of Calmira to Windows NT 3.51 has been made, and the project has resulted in NT Shell.

== Forks ==
Being open source, some people developed their own forks of Calmira, adding other features and customizations. Here is a list of the most popular ones:

- Calmira LFN: Fork developed by Alexandre Rodrigues de Sousa that supports long filenames, better icon shading, a My Documents icon, and a dialog to change the wallpaper. The final version, 3.32 (released on December 19, 2006), also has custom window borders that mimic Windows 95.
  - Calmira Reborn: Fork of Calmira LFN developed by Hunter "Lilia" Turcin that addresses a number of bugs present in version 3.32.
- Calmira XP: Fork developed by ABZone that aims to mimic the Windows XP interface. Version 4.0 Beta added support for long filenames and a login screen, among other features. Development ceased in November 2006.

Other versions, as well as the original version of Calmira, can be found at Calmira Online!.

== Calmira NextGen ==
Calmira NextGen was released on 14. November 2026 by Peter Protus - original developer of Calmira Longhorn, on Vogons.com forum.

Calmira NextGen is completely rewritten from scratch in C++ instead of Delphi that was used develop original Calmira.

Calmira NextGen supports multiple languages that can be switched between on fly, without need of restart and new languages can be added by simply translating en.lng into different language and save it under new file.

Calmira NextGen brings new features to Windows 3.1x that include application preview on taskbar, native Long File Name support, native zip files extracting and packing and also includes some useful software like Calmira Commander - a two panel file manager, Calmira Pad which replaces Notepad for LFN support, Calmira Viewer - a image viewer, Calmira Writerwhich replaces Write (WordPad) for LFN support.

Calmira also brings stretch background to Windows 3.1 which does not support that feature officially.

Latest stable version is 1.1
