= Indexing Service =

Feature of Microsoft Windows

- The Indexing Service Query Form, used to query Indexing Service catalogs, hosted in Microsoft Management Console
- Developer: Microsoft
- Operating system: Microsoft Windows
- Successor: Windows Search
- Service name: Indexing Service
- Type: Desktop search

Indexing Service (originally called Index Server) was a Windows service that maintained an index of most of the files on a computer to improve searching performance on PCs and corporate computer networks. It updated indexes without user intervention. In Windows Vista it was replaced by the newer Windows Search Indexer. The IFilter plugins to extend the indexing capabilities to more file formats and protocols are compatible between the legacy Indexing Service how and the newer Windows Search Indexer.

== History ==
Indexing Service was a desktop search service included with Windows NT 4.0 Option Pack as well as Windows 2000 and later. The first incarnation of the indexing service was shipped in August 1996 as a content search system for Microsoft's web server software, Internet Information Services. Its origins, however, date further back to Microsoft's Cairo operating system project, with the component serving as the Content Indexer for the Object File System. Cairo was eventually shelved, but the content indexing capabilities would go on to be included as a standard component of later Windows desktop and server operating systems, starting with Windows 2000, which includes Indexing Service 3.0.

In Windows Vista, the content indexer was replaced with the Windows Search indexer which was enabled by default. Indexing Service is still included with Windows Server 2008 but is not installed or running by default.

Indexing Service has been deprecated in Windows 7 and Windows Server 2008 R2. It has been removed from Windows 8.

== Search interfaces ==
Comprehensive searching is available after initial building of the index, which can take up to hours or days, depending on the size of the specified directories, the speed of the hard drive, user activity, indexer settings and other factors. Searching using Indexing service works also on UNC paths and/or mapped network drives if the sharing server indexes appropriate directory and is aware of its sharing.

Once the indexing service has been turned on and has built its index it can be searched in three ways. The search option available from the Start menu on the Windows Taskbar will use the indexing service if it is enabled and will even accept complex queries. Queries can also be performed using either the Indexing Service Query Form in the Computer Management snap-in of Microsoft Management Console, or, alternatively, using third-party applications such as 'Aim at File' or 'Grokker Desktop'.
