= SweetLabs =

American software distribution company

- Industry: Application Management, Devices
- Genre: Digital distribution, Software update, Application software
- Founded: 2008
- Number of locations: 2
- Products: App Install Platform, Pokki Start Menu and App Store.
- Number of employees: 70
- Website: sweetlabs.com

SweetLabs is a software distribution company based in San Diego and Seattle. SweetLabs has raised at least $21.5 million in venture capital from Bessemer Venture Partners, Google Ventures, Intel Capital, and O’Reilly AlphaTech Ventures.

== Products ==
SweetLabs creates products primarily designed for use by software developers, advertisers, and manufacturers of devices that run on Android and Windows.

In May 2014, SweetLabs released the App Install Platform, cloud-based and client-side services which include an App Ad Server designed to give manufacturers the ability to customize and manage the apps that are delivered to devices. This includes an advertising network that opens a marketplace for app install ad-space, as well as analytics and data collection related to these advertisements. The App Install Platform was used by device manufacturers including Acer, Toshiba and Lenovo.

In June 2011, SweetLabs launched Pokki, a replacement for Windows 8's Start Menu Pokki is designed to return the core functionality of the Start Menu, to restore features such as the ability to find and launch programs and apps, access folders and files, search the computer and the web, manage settings, and shut down. The Pokki Start menu also includes a notification center, a smartphone-like home screen to organize apps, sites, files, and folders, an app store, and access to web and desktop apps such as Pixsta. Pokki is classified as a malicious program, i.e. "viruses and spyware" by Sophos antivirus software.

SweetLabs also produced an adware module called OpenCandy. This software is classified as malware by many anti-virus vendors, due to the software's use of invasive browser hijacking.
