= RetroUI =

RetroUI Pro for Windows 8
- Developer: Thinix
- Initial release: September 2012
- Operating system: Windows 8, Windows Server 2012
- Type: Shell
- Website: retroui.com

RetroUI is a utility for Windows 8 (applies to the Pro editions) and Windows Server 2012 (the Server edition) by Thinix that modifies Windows Shell, especially the Start menu and taskbar. RetroUI places a Start menu and start button on the Windows taskbar, makes taskbar visible on the Start screen, and allows users to run Windows Store apps in re-sizable windows. RetroUI was launched in September 2012.

== See also ==
- Comparison of Start menu replacements for Windows 8
