= MiniGUI =

- Developer(s): Beijing Feynman Software Technology
- Initial release: 1999
- Stable release: 1.6.10 / August 1, 2008; 16 years ago
- Operating system: Cross-platform
- Type: GUI system
- Website: http://www.minigui.org

MiniGUI is a GUI system with support for real-time and embedded operating systems, and aims to be fast, stable, light-weight and cross-platform. It was first released under the GNU GPL in 1999, and has since offered a commercial version with more features, including support for operating systems other than Linux and eCos. MiniGUI has been widely used in handheld terminals, portable media players, and industry instruments.

== History ==
MiniGUI was started by Wei Yongming as a simple interface for a control system based on Linux. The project was developed independently under the GNU GPL until September 2002, when the developers founded Feynman Software Technology and began commercial marketing of the software.

In October 2003, MiniGUI was ported to μClinux and eCos.

== Features ==
- Support for many embedded operating systems, including Linux and its derivative μClinux, eCos, VxWorks, pSOS, ThreadX and Nucleus
- Support for embedded resources and as a result devices without file systems
- Compatibility with Windows resource file formats including icons and cursors.
- Skin support
- Support for many character sets, including ISO8859 and BIG5
