= TabWorks =

Computer software

- Developer: Xerox
- Release: 1993; 33 years ago
- Final release: 2.5
- Operating system: Windows 3.x and 95
- Platform: x86
- Type: GUI
- License: Proprietary

TabWorks is a replacement shell for Windows 3.x and Windows 95 developed by XSoft, a division of Xerox PARC. It organizes files and applications in a tabbed 3-ring notebook user interface, making it easier for novice users to navigate Windows.

The software was created to replace Program Manager on Windows 3.x and the shell on Windows 95. The user interface concept was a collaboration between IDEO and XSoft. The concept was originally developed at Xerox PARC by Stuart Card, Robert Kincaid, Sonny Lundin, Kim Medrano, Ed Stitt, Gary Schoolcraft, Hal Schoolcraft, Steven Calwas, Steve Farrell, Kerry Kobashi, Janine Walters, Pat Gibberson, Rick Soriano, and David Ching.

TabWorks was shipped in 1993 and distributed with PCs from 1993 to around 1997 by several companies, including Compaq and NEC. Over 9 million copies of the software were installed worldwide.

Microsoft did not like that Compaq was creating systems that replaced the primary Windows user interface.

"Since the release of Windows 95, Microsoft has become aware of instances in which OEMs are modifying the product as a method of differentiating their hardware. This has caused considerable confusion with our end user customers. As a result, Microsoft is taking this opportunity to define the requirements and restrictions of the preinstallation process, so that all of our end users have a consistent experience with our products."

Compaq stopped bundling TabWorks with its machines in 1996, claiming it was no longer necessary given the improvements to the shell in Windows 95.

TabWorks was later acquired in 1996 by Citadel Computer systems, which integrated it into their line of network security and desktop utility product lines. Citadel discontinued selling TabWorks in early 2001.
