= Pokki =

Free digital distribution platform

- Developer: SweetLabs Inc.
- Operating system: Windows 8, Windows 7, Windows XP
- Type: Digital distribution
- License: Freeware
- Website: www.pokki.com

Pokki is a free digital distribution platform and Windows Shell extension by SweetLabs, Inc., that alters the start menu to a look and feel like the second generation start menu used before Windows 8. The extension also adds additional functionality to the start menu including search, favorites, and popular applications.

Pokki has been identified as adware by Malwaretips and as "viruses and spyware" by Sophos AV.

== History ==
The program launched as a beta version in June 2011. Pokki's framework is built on Chromium and allows developers to build desktop applications using standard web languages like HTML5, CSS3, and JavaScript.

In April 2012, Pokki launched the Pokki Store, a marketplace and app store for desktop apps for social networking services and social gaming apps. The Pokki Store allows users to browse, search, and download applications in various categories. Applications are submitted by developers through the Pokki Developer Center.

In August 2012, Pokki exited beta, announced 1 million monthly active users, and released the Pokki Menu, an app launcher for access, management, and discovery of its apps, and a notification center for real-time updates.

In October 2012, Pokki for Windows 8 was released which included functionality to restore the Windows start menu which was replaced in Windows 8 by the start screen. As of January 2013, it had about 1.5 million users.
