= Cairo (operating system) =

Codename for a Microsoft software project

Microsoft Cairo
- Cairo Server login screen, based on Windows NT 4.0 Server (1175.1)
- Developer: Microsoft
- Working state: Historical
- Released to manufacturing: Cancelled
- Kernel type: Hybrid (NT)
- Official website: www.microsoft.com

Cairo was the codename for a project at Microsoft from 1991 to 1996. Its charter was to build technologies for a next-generation operating system that would fulfill Bill Gates's vision of "information at your fingertips." Cairo never shipped, although portions of its technologies have since appeared in other products.

== Overview ==
Cairo was announced at the 1991 Microsoft Professional Developers Conference by Jim Allchin. It was demonstrated publicly (including a demo system for all attendees to use) at the 1993 Cairo/Win95 PDC. Microsoft changed its stance on Cairo several times, sometimes calling it a product, other times referring to it as a collection of technologies.

== Features ==
Cairo used distributed computing concepts to make information available quickly and seamlessly across a worldwide network of computers.

The Windows 95 user interface was based on the initial design work that was done on the Cairo user interface. DCE/RPC shipped in Windows NT 3.1. Content Indexing is now a part of Internet Information Server and Windows Desktop Search.

The remaining component is the object file system. It was once planned to be implemented in the form of WinFS as part of Windows Vista but development was cancelled in June 2006, with some of its technologies merged into other Microsoft products such as Microsoft SQL Server 2008, also known under the codename "Katmai".

== See also ==
- History of Microsoft Windows
- List of Microsoft codenames
