= OpenSearch (specification) =

Protocols for syndicating search results

- Example of a web page which offers to add a new search plugin. With Firefox, the symbol of the currently selected search engine becomes bluish. The user can add the search engine offered by that page by clicking the triangle.
- Internet media type: application/opensearchdescription+xml
- Developed by: Amazon.com
- Initial release: March 15, 2005
- Latest release: 1.1 Draft 6 December 6, 2005; 20 years ago
- Type of format: Web syndication
- Extended from: RSS
- Open format?: Creative Commons Attribution-ShareAlike 2.5
- Website: github.com/dewitt/opensearch

OpenSearch is a collection of technologies that allow the publishing of search results in a format suitable for syndication and aggregation. Introduced in 2005, it is a way for websites and search engines to publish search results in a standard and accessible format.

OpenSearch was developed by Amazon.com subsidiary A9 and the first version, OpenSearch 1.0, was unveiled by Jeff Bezos at the O'Reilly Emerging Technology Conference on 15 March 2005. Draft versions of OpenSearch 1.1 were released during September and December 2005. The OpenSearch specification is licensed by A9 under the Creative Commons Attribution-ShareAlike 2.5 License.

== Support ==
Web browsers that support OpenSearch include Safari, Microsoft Edge, Firefox and Google Chrome.

Mozilla have indicated that they will deprecate OpenSearch search addons in favour of WebExtensions search addons. This will not affect the ability to manually add an OpenSearch engine from a website As of December 5, 2019, search engine add-ons for Firefox that are powered by OpenSearch have been removed from Mozilla Add-ons.

== Design ==
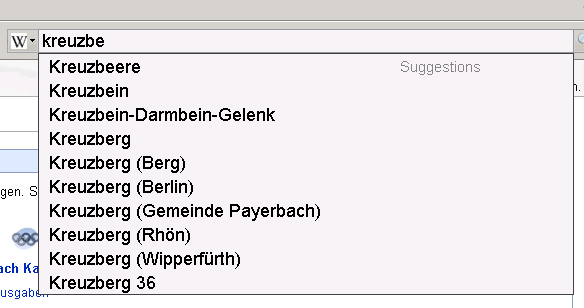
Search suggestions in the German Wikipedia

OpenSearch consists of:

1. OpenSearch Description files: XML files that identify and describe a search engine.
2. OpenSearch Query Syntax: describe where to retrieve the search results
3. OpenSearch RSS (in OpenSearch 1.0) or OpenSearch Response (in OpenSearch 1.1): format for providing search results.
4. OpenSearch Aggregators: Sites that can display OpenSearch results.
5. OpenSearch "Auto-discovery" to signal the presence of a search plugin link to the user and the link embedded in the header of HTML pages

OpenSearch Description Documents list search result responses for the given website/tool. Version 1.0 of the specification only allowed one response, in RSS format; however, version 1.1 provides support for multiple responses, which may be in any format. RSS and Atom are the only ones formally supported by OpenSearch aggregators, however other types, such as HTML are perfectly acceptable.

- Auto-discovery of an OpenSearch Description Document is available from both HTML and Atom or RSS feed documents via Link relations in the form of <atom:link rel="search" ... /> for Atom feeds or <link rel="search" ... /> for RSS feeds and HTML documents.
- OpenSearch Description Document must be placed on a web server of the same domain.
- OpenSearch Description Documents must be served with the application/opensearchdescription+xml Internet media type.

== Alternatives ==
Mozilla Firefox offers a bookmark keyword feature where an occurrence of %s in the bookmark URI gets replaced with the terms typed in the address bar following the initial keyword.

== See also ==
- Sherlock (software)
- Representational State Transfer (REST)
- GraphQL
- OpenURL
- Search/Retrieve via URL (SRU)
- Z39.50
