= Tabbles =

File-tagging application built for Windows operating system

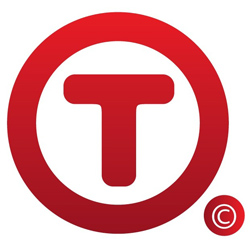
- Developer(s): Tag-Forge ApS
- Initial release: 1 August 2009; 15 years ago
- Stable release: 5.9.2 / 10 February 2020; 5 years ago
- Operating system: Microsoft Windows
- Type: Utility software
- License: Freemium
- Website: tabbles.net

Tabbles is a file-tagging application and relational file manager for Windows which is used to organize contents. It can tag any file type in any file system locally or over a network.

The name "Tabbles" is portmanteau of tag and bubbles.

== Overview ==
Tabbles generates in real-time a tag-based relational file system, where tags can be accessed as folders or used as keywords for search. Unlike Windows tagging system, it supports any kind of files and documents on local and shared drives, as well as many cloud storage or file synchronization systems like Dropbox. Tabbles allows users to collaboratively tag files on network drives, through group and user policy management.

== Data management model ==
Tabbles implements a relational approach to file and data management, as an extension to the traditional file management being hierarchically structured, similar to Microsoft's WinFS. Files, emails and bookmarks are categorized by labeling them with tags, instead of placing them in hierarchical folders or containers. The data is then browsed, sorted and retrieved by navigating and searching through tags, or combination of tags. Tags are visualised and browsed as virtual folders. A relational file system is generated dynamically, independently from the physical location of the data. This allows for files or emails physically stored in different folders or machines, to be grouped and browsed together at once.

== Technology ==
Tabbles was among the first commercial software developed in F# and WPF, and was featured on F# creator's blog. It has a client-server architecture, requires a Microsoft SQL Server to run and relies on stored procedures for the core logic and the security management. Tabbles is tightly integrated with Windows and Windows Explorer using several APIs: FileSystemWatcher, IFileOperationProgressSync, Overlay Handlers, ContextMenu Handlers, Win32 API, Office interop, Outlook interop. It uses VSTO to integrate into Microsoft Outlook.

== Features ==
- Tagging files in local folders, network drives, removable drives, optical disks
- Auto-tagging files and folders, local and remote, based on user defined rules
- Tagging files from the application's GUI, Windows Explorer, from 3rd party file managers, from command line and via APIs
- Tags on files and folders managed by file synchronization tools (such as Dropbox) are synchronized
- User and groups privileges for tagging on shared folder and network drives
- Graphically browse through single tags or combinations, as if in virtual folders
- Tag emails (in Microsoft Outlook) and bookmarks
- Administrator management window for user and groups creation and management

== In the media ==
Tabbles received multiple reviews, among others from the Washington Post, Lifehacker, Chip and several paper magazines. Reviews were typically mildly positive and focused on the innovative side of the application.

== See also ==
- Virtual folder
- Windows Explorer
- WinFS
