= Development of Windows Vista =

Development of the 2006 Microsoft operating system

The development of Windows Vista (codenamed Longhorn) began in May 2001, prior to the final development stages of Windows XP, and went through several builds, until Longhorn was ultimately scrapped and reset under the name Vista. Development continued until November 8, 2006, when it was released to manufacturing. Windows Vista was then released generally to retail on January 30, 2007.

== Background ==
Microsoft originally expected to ship a minor release of Windows code-named "Longhorn" sometime in October 2003 as a minor step between Windows XP (codenamed "Whistler") and the next planned major release of Windows, code-named "Blackcomb". Longhorn was an allusion to this plan: While Whistler and Blackcomb are large ski resorts in British Columbia, Longhorn is the name of a bar between the two mountains that Whistler's visitors pass to reach Blackcomb.

Gradually, Windows Longhorn assimilated many of the important new features and technologies slated for Blackcomb, resulting in the release date being pushed back a few times. Many of Microsoft's developers were also re-tasked with improving the security of Windows XP. Faced with ongoing delays with Longhorn and concerns about feature creep, Microsoft announced on August 27, 2004, that it was making significant changes. Longhorn development started afresh, building on the Windows Server 2003 SP1 code-base, and re-incorporating only the features that would be intended for an actual operating system release. Some previously announced features, such as WinFS and NGSCB, were dropped or postponed.

After Longhorn was renamed to Windows Vista in mid-2005, an unprecedented beta-test program was started which involved hundreds of thousands of volunteers and companies. Between September 2005 and October 2006, Microsoft released regular Community Technology Previews (CTP) to beta testers and two release candidates to the general public. Development of Windows Vista concluded with the November 8, 2006 announcement of its completion by co-president of Windows development, Jim Allchin.

U.S. and E.U. anti-monopoly law, as well as the United States v. Microsoft, also the one reason that makes development of Windows Vista slower.

== Build information ==
Most pre-release builds of Windows (including Longhorn and Vista) were identified by a label that was always displayed in the bottom-right corner of the desktop, also called a watermark. The watermark would look like this (note that the following text below is left-aligned by default; this text is usually displayed right-aligned in the actual OS):

Longhorn XP Professional
For testing purposes only. Build 3683.Lab06_N.020923-1821

Higher build numbers didn't automatically mean that the latest features from every development team at Microsoft were included. Typically, a team working on a certain feature or subsystem would generate their working builds which developers would test with, and when the code was deemed stable, all the changes would be incorporated back into the main development tree at once. At Microsoft, several "Build labs" exist where the compilation of the entirety of Windows can be performed by a team. The lab in which any given build originated is shown as part of the build label, and the date and time of the build follow that.

In the case of above example (derived from Windows Longhorn build 3683), the name of the operating system ("Longhorn XP Professional") is displayed on the first row of the watermark, with the other text displayed underneath it containing the phrase "For testing purposes only" (indicating that a test certificate is installed in the build), and the build number, the name of the build lab, and the compile date of the build ("Build 3683.Lab06_N.020923-1821" means that the build of Windows Longhorn is 3683, compiled by the Lab06_N build lab on September 23, 2002 at 18:21 or 6:21 PM PDT).

Some builds (such as Beta 1 and Beta 2) only display the build label in the version information dialog (Winver), and the icons are from Windows XP. Most of the standard applets from Windows XP (including the Windows XP Tour applet) were retained in all pre-reset and most post-reset builds but were removed in later builds as the operating system was nearing completion. All pre-reset builds and some of the early post-reset builds still ran on the same SKUs as found on Windows XP but was changed to their final SKUs by the time the first publicly available version of the post-reset build of Longhorn was introduced.

The OOBE (the setup process) in the Milestone 3 builds is the same as Windows XP but with different music. It uses "No Hay Problema" by Pink Martini instead of the "Windows Welcome Music" composed by Stan LePard, which is also present in Windows Server 2003 but goes unused as the OOBE is not used in that operating system.

=== Misattributed system sounds ===
The widespread sound scheme often attributed to Longhorn was never included in any official build and originates from a Windows XP theme produced by Samsung Electronics in 2003. The Windows XP sounds remain and are used in all pre-reset and post-reset builds, with a few being swapped with Vista sounds between builds 5466 and 5840.16384.

The alleged Windows Vista Beta 1 startup sound is actually WELCOMESEQUENCE.WAV used in the Speech Recognition tutorial from build 5308.6. Likewise, an alternative interpretation of the final startup sound that is sometimes labeled as the Windows Vista Beta 2 startup sound is actually a jingle used in the outro of several Windows Vista Beta 2 demo videos.

== 2001–2002: Early development (pre-reset builds) ==
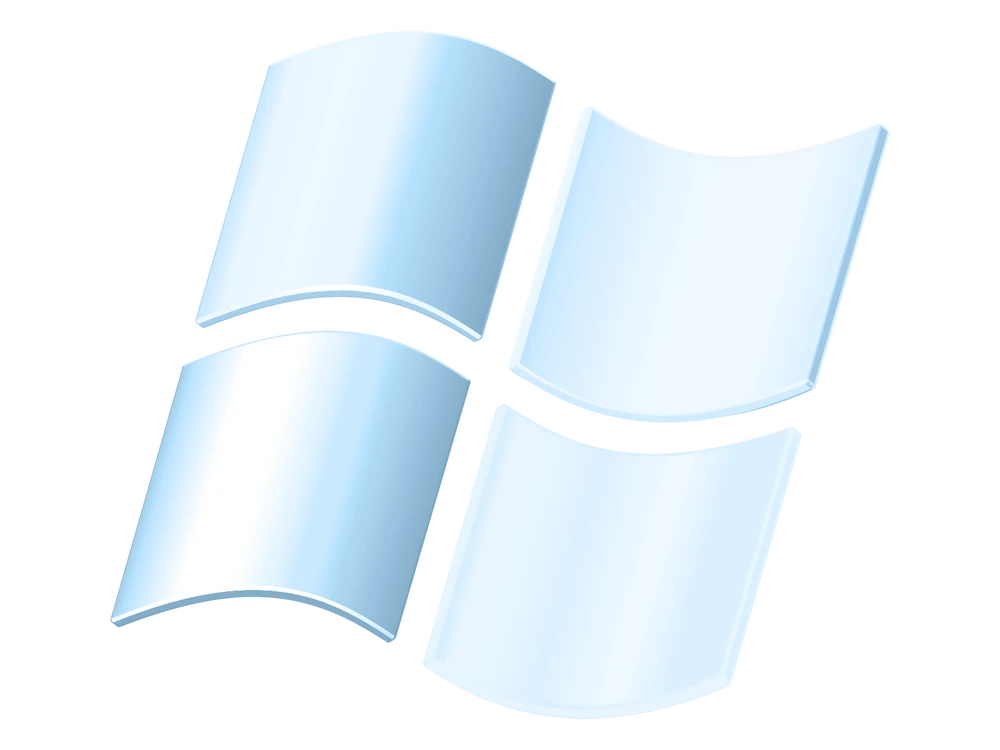
The Longhorn logo, used for several milestones/pre-betas between 2002 and 2004

The early development stages of Longhorn were generally characterized by incremental improvements and updates to Windows XP. During this period, Microsoft was fairly quiet about what was being worked on, as their marketing and public relations focus were more strongly focused on Windows XP and Windows Server 2003, the latter of which was released in April 2003. Occasional builds of Longhorn were leaked onto popular file sharing networks such as IRC, BitTorrent, eDonkey and various newsgroups, and so most of what is known about builds before the first sanctioned development release of Longhorn in May 2003, is derived from these builds.

=== Milestone 3 ===
Build 3663 (Lab06_N) (build date of July 28, 2002) was the first known build with leaked screenshots. It shares a similar build number with Release Candidate 1 of Windows Server 2003 (then known as "Windows .NET Server" at the time), of which this build (and later builds in the "pre-reset" era) was built off of. Also, some screenshots of build 3670 (Lab06_N) (build date of August 19, 2002), which showed a version of Device Manager implemented into Windows Explorer (which later appeared in Windows 7), leaked.

Screenshot of Windows Longhorn Build 3683

Build 3683 (Lab06_N) (build date of September 23, 2002) was the first Windows Longhorn build leaked to the Internet (on November 19, 2002), and was the first of several that had a desktop watermark identifying itself as "Longhorn XP Professional". Visually very similar to Windows XP, one of the notable changes was that the Windows logo was only white, not colored like all the versions of Windows before it. Also the templates in the My Documents and My Pictures were notably different as well as the Open and Save as dialog boxes also included the template, incorporating aesthetic changes and a few new user interface options. A new "Sidebar" was also present, which contained many of the gadgets that would much later be seen in Windows Sidebar, such as an analog clock, slide show, and search capability. An option in this version of the sidebar also made it possible to move the Start button into it, and disable the traditional taskbar entirely. An early revision of WinFS was also included, but very little in the way of a user interface was included, and as such it appeared to early testers to be nothing more than a service that consumed large amounts of memory and processor time. The "Display Properties" control panel was the first significant departure, being built on the new "Avalon" API. It was the first sighting of the "Plex" style which Microsoft regarded as a placeholder theme for their development versions, until they were ready to demonstrate Aero.

Build 3706 (Lab06_N) (build date of October 29, 2002) was leaked on May 22, 2006. It was one of the first builds to include the Desktop Composition Engine (DCE), which later became the Desktop Window Manager (DWM). This build appeared on the Internet long after other builds from this period, and included several of the changes that were first reported as being part of later milestone builds, including Internet Explorer 6.05 and the "Plex" theme.

Build 3718 (Lab06_N) (build date of November 19, 2002) was leaked on April 20, 2004. It included the DCE and some early hardware-accelerated alpha transparency and transition effects. As a demonstration of the DCE's capabilities, programs flipped into the taskbar and twisted as they were minimized.

== 2003 and early 2004: New technology ==
=== Milestone 4 ===
After several months of relatively little news or activity from Microsoft with Longhorn, build 4008 (main) (with a build date of February 19, 2003) made an appearance on the Internet on February 28, 2003. It was also privately handed out to a select group of software developers. This was the earliest known build of Longhorn to be built by the "main" branch as previous builds were built on the "Lab06_N" branch. As an evolutionary release over build 3683, it contained a number of small improvements, including a modified blue "Plex" theme and a new, simplified Windows Image-based installer that operated in graphical mode from the outset, and completed an install of the operating system in approximately one third the time of Windows XP on the same hardware. An optional "new taskbar" was introduced that was thinner than the previous build and displayed the time differently. This "new taskbar" also displayed taskbar buttons at the center rather than on the left, something that would resurface 18 years later with Windows 11.

The most notable visual and functional difference, however, came with Windows Explorer. The incorporation of the Plex theme made blue the dominant color of the entire application. The Windows XP-style task pane was almost completely replaced with a large horizontal pane that appeared under the toolbars. A new search interface allowed for filtering of results, searching for Windows help, and natural-language queries that would be used to integrate with WinFS. The animated search characters were also removed. The "view modes" were also replaced with a single slider that would resize the icons in real-time, in a list, thumbnail, or details mode, depending on where the slider was. File metadata was also made more visible and more easily editable, with more active encouragement to fill out missing pieces of information. Also of note was the conversion of Windows Explorer to being a .NET application.

=== Milestone 5 ===
Screenshot of Windows Longhorn Build 4015

Build 4015 (main) (build date of March 28, 2003) was leaked to the Internet on April 25, 2003. Several features Microsoft had been working on were rolled into this build, such as a range of parental controls, a Windows logo moved and enlarged to the left side of the Start button, a lot of additional configurability for the sidebar (including being able to put it below the taskbar at the bottom of the screen), and the notion of "Libraries" (later known as virtual folders) of files. These libraries collected content from around the hard drive. The user could then filter this content and save it in a folder. Microsoft had originally intended to replace all special shell folders (My Documents, My Music, etc.) with virtual folders. However, this change was deemed too drastic and was dropped after Beta 1's release in mid-2005. Libraries were later included in Windows 7. This build was also notable for the debut of a simplified boot screen containing only the operating system logo and progress bar, which would resemble the one seen in the final release (though 4015's version of the progress bar was blue, not green (being largely similar to Windows XP); the final release also lacked an official logo and had copyright information moved underneath the progress bar). A new Download Manager shell location suggested that Internet Explorer would get a Mozilla-style download manager, though no such functionality was apparent. Significant memory leak problems with Windows Explorer and the Sidebar made this build difficult to use, which resulted in some third-party hacks to mitigate the problem. The back-end database of Outlook Express changed completely and became dependent on WinFS to store its e-mails. WinFS itself still had significant performance and memory usage issues, and so it became common for testers to disable WinFS entirely, thus rendering Outlook Express inoperative.

At the Windows Hardware Engineering Conference (WinHEC) in May 2003, Microsoft gave their first public demonstrations of the new Desktop Window Manager and Aero. These demonstrations were done on an internal build of 4015 which was never released (Lab06_n). Several sessions for developers and hardware engineers at the conference focused on these new features, as well as the Next-Generation Secure Computing Base (previously known as "Palladium"), which at the time was Microsoft's proposed solution for creating a secure computing environment. Also at this conference, Microsoft reiterated their roadmap for delivering Longhorn, pointing to an "early 2005" release date.

Build 4029 (main) (build date of June 19, 2003) was leaked on September 14, 2003. This build contained a few of the technologies new to build 4015. Windows Explorer went through several other changes. Larger image and video previews were displayed in a tooltip when the mouse hovered over a file, column-level filtering of results was introduced, and the overall performance of Explorer was somewhat improved over build 4015, though the memory leak issues were not entirely resolved. There was also a new analog clock user interface. Batch image processing of images was also introduced, making it possible for a user to rotate several images at once.

This build was also the first of the several to use Pig Latin strings for the name of the operating system. Build 4029's name was displayed as "onghornLay rofessionalPay ersionVay 2003" (Pig Latin for "Longhorn Professional Version 2003") in various places around the operating system, including the desktop watermark, which was changed from "Longhorn XP Professional" to "onghornLay rofessionalPay" (Pig Latin for "Longhorn Professional"). While some had presumed that screenshots of this build were fake because of this seemingly obvious mistake, Microsoft later explained that this was merely a test of some new code to locate and reduce the number of places in the operating system code that the name was defined.

Build 4028 (Lab01_N) (build date of July 1, 2003) was a build of a Server version of Longhorn that was compiled a few days after build 4029 of its client counterpart, in spite of having an earlier build number than the aforementioned build. It is currently the earliest known Server build of Longhorn. Like its client counterparts, it is based on the Windows .NET Server Release Candidate 1 codebase (which later became Windows Server 2003). As with Windows Server 2003 up until Windows Server 2008 R2, the Themes service was disabled by default, while the Welcome Screen was not available.

Much like with build 4029 before it, this build uses Pig Latin strings for the name of the operating system in various places, being known as "onghornLay erverSay nterpriseEay erverSay ersionVay 2003" (Pig Latin for Longhorn Server Enterprise Server Version 2003) in this build; this was part of a testing process that Microsoft has done to reduce the amount of places where the operating system name was manually defined.

=== Milestone 6 ===
Build 4029 (Lab06_n) (build date of June 29, 2003) was similar to the Milestone 5 compile of build 4029 with minor improvements. It has a new default wallpaper that uses a red color scheme instead of blue, distinguishing itself from its Milestone 5 counterpart.

Build 4033 (main) (build date of July 17, 2003) was similar to both Milestone 5 and 6 compiles of build 4029, but contained some UI improvements, including an updated Plex theme.

Build 4039 (Lab06_n) (build date of August 27, 2003) was leaked on August 22, 2007. This build includes Phodeo, a 3D view of displaying photos, and full DWM and glass.

Build 4040 (Lab04_n) (build date of August 28, 2003) was leaked on January 31, 2020. It is similar to build 4039 with minor improvements.

Build 4042 (main) (build date of September 5, 2003) was leaked on January 23, 2020, and is similar to builds 4039 and 4040. It was compiled four days before its Lab06_n counterpart, and was the last build to contain the Plex visual style, the boot screen from build 4015, the Milestone 6 default wallpaper, and the Pig Latin strings for the operating system's name.

Build 4042 (Lab06_n) (build date of September 9, 2003) was the earliest build to include the Slate theme (Lab06) instead of the Plex theme (main) seen in the previous builds. However, the Aero glass from Build 4039 was still present. The boot screen and the default background wallpaper was changed; the boot screen progress bar color was changed from blue to orange. The word "My" was removed from "Computer" and "Network Places", a change that carried over to the final version of the operating system. When Windows Sidebar was enabled, the word "Start" was removed from the Start button—a development used later in Windows Vista. Pig Latin strings were changed back to their non-Pig Latin counterparts; the operating system now identifies itself as "Longhorn Professional Version 2003" due to the changes.

Build 4050 (idx02) (build date of September 28, 2003) was leaked on January 23, 2020. It was the latest "Home" build of pre-reset Longhorn. The desktop watermark was changed from "Longhorn [edition name]" to "Windows® Code Name "Longhorn"". Other builds of Longhorn using the 4050 build number were used in various Microsoft demos, including the 2003 Professional Developers Conference (PDC) and TechEd Israel in 2004.

Build 4051 (idx02) (build date of October 1, 2003) is the build that was given to the attendees of the 2003 PDC show. It was leaked on October 20, 2003, seven days before the start of the conference. It officially introduced the Slate theme, which was present in build 4042 (Lab06_n) that was released internally a month prior. This build also contained an updated version of Internet Explorer with a version number of 6.05. New features noted by reviewers included a Download Manager, pop-up blocker, add-on manager and a tool to clear browsing history. Except for the download manager, which was eventually discarded, these features all appeared in builds of Internet Explorer included with preview builds of Windows XP Service Pack 2 a few months later.

=== Milestone 7 ===
Build 4053 (main) (build date of October 22, 2003) was leaked on March 2, 2004, and had some minor changes.

Build 4066 (main) (build date of February 26, 2004) was a "Server" build that contained many of the features only ever seen and associated with desktop builds. An updated version of Phodeo was included, as well as the Sidebar, a Mini-Windows Media Player, and associated sidebar tiles, a functioning build of the Desktop Window Manager and the Jade theme. Jade notably used Segoe UI as the font for the theme, which would later be applied to Aero in the final version of Vista. This build also replaced many XP icons with new high resolution Longhorn icons, some of which greatly resemble icons in the final version of Vista. This build was leaked on December 20, 2008.

In May 2004, Microsoft changed its plans to include the Next-Generation Secure Computing Base technology with Longhorn. The technology, better known by its original code-name of "Palladium", had garnered much criticism from analysts, security specialists, and researchers, and was often cited by advocates of non-Microsoft operating systems as a reason to migrate to their preferred platform. Ross Anderson, for example, published a paper, collating many of these concerns and criticisms as part of a larger analysis on Trusted Computing. In light of a large amount of negative response not only from analysts, but enterprise customers and software developers, Microsoft shelved many aspects of the NGSCB project for an indefinite period. The only aspect of NGSCB that was included with the final release of the operating system is BitLocker, a drive-encryption technology which can make use of a Trusted Platform Module chip to facilitate secure startup and protect user data.

Build 4067 (private/lddm_dev_tech(davidmo)) (build date of February 12, 2004) was a private beta shown during the Jim Allchin keynote at WinHEC 2004 on May 4, 2004.

Build 4067 (idx01) (build date of March 12, 2004) was leaked in July 2021. It was an Itanium-only build that introduced many features from build 4066 into this build, including the Jade theme and high resolution icons, although the Slate theme was still set by default.

Screenshot of Windows Longhorn WinHEC 2004 preview (Build 4074)

Build 4074 (idx02) (build date of April 25, 2004) is the official WinHEC 2004 preview build that was leaked in May 2004, and is also the most familiar pre-reset build. It was the first leaked build to have complete Aero effects in Windows Explorer and Internet Explorer from the Desktop Window Manager; however, a registry modification was required to extend the effect into the full UI. It incorporates the Jade theme by default, although the Slate theme was still set as an option.

Build 4081 (main) (build date of May 3, 2004) was leaked on January 27, 2020. This build is the first componentized build, meaning many core features were removed, and introduced several bugs. Considered highly unstable, including the absence of programs in the Start menu, and driver and installation issues.

Build 4083 (main) (build date of May 16, 2004) was leaked on November 10, 2004 for the x64 version and on February 1, 2020 for the x86 version. Desktop Window Manager was dropped from this release. Considered highly unstable, including the absence of programs in the Start menu, and driver and installation issues.

Build 4093 (main) (build date of August 19, 2004) was one of the last builds compiled before the development reset. It was also the last build to be compiled under the "main" branch as it was renamed to "winmain" shortly after the development reset. Considered highly unstable, including the absence of programs in the Start menu, and driver and installation issues, it contained Sidebar, WinFS, and an Avalon-based Windows Movie Maker, a preliminary version of Windows Anytime Upgrade, and the Microsoft Anna speech synthesizer. There was also an Avalon-based Display Properties control panel applet similar to the one in Build 3683 hidden in the %SystemRoot%\WINDOWS\SYSTEM32 folder, and includes an early version of the .NET Managed rewrite of Desktop Window Manager that is not installed by default.

== Mid-2004 to mid-2005: Development "reset" (post-reset builds) ==
By 2004, it had become obvious to the Windows team at Microsoft that they were losing sight of what needed to be done to complete the next version of Windows and ship it to customers. Internally, some Microsoft employees were describing the Longhorn project as "another Cairo" or "Cairo.NET", referring to the Cairo development project that the company embarked on through the first half of the 1990s, which never resulted in a shipping operating system (though nearly all the technologies developed during that time did end up in Windows 95 and Windows NT). In 2005, Microsoft was shocked with the release of Apple's Mac OS X Tiger. It offered only a limited subset of features planned for Longhorn, in particular fast file searching and integrated graphics and sound processing, but appeared to have impressive reliability and performance compared to contemporary Longhorn builds. Most Longhorn builds had major Explorer.exe system leaks which prevented the OS from performing well, and added more confusion to the development teams in later builds with more and more code being developed which failed to reach stability.

In a September 23, 2005 front-page article on The Wall Street Journal, Microsoft co-president Jim Allchin, who had overall responsibility for the development and delivery of Windows, explained how development of Longhorn was "crashing into the ground" due in large part to the haphazard methods by which features were introduced and integrated into the core of the operating system without a clear focus on an end-product. In December 2003, Allchin enlisted the help of two other senior executives, Brian Valentine and Amitabh Srivastava, the former being experienced with shipping software at Microsoft, most notably Windows Server 2003, and the latter having spent his career at Microsoft researching and developing methods of producing high-quality testing systems. Srivastava employed a team of core architects to visually map out the entirety of the Windows operating system, and to proactively work towards a development process that would enforce high levels of code quality, reduce interdependencies between components, and in general, "not make things worse with Vista". These things, in conjunction with the fact that many of Microsoft's most skilled developers and engineers had been working on Windows Server 2003, led to the decision to "reset" development of Longhorn, building on the same code that would become Windows Server 2003 Service Pack 1, instead of the older Windows .NET Server Release Candidate 1 code (Build 3663).

This change, announced internally to Microsoft employees on August 26, 2004, began in earnest in September, though it would take several more months before the new development process and build methodology would be used by all of the development teams. Several complaints came from individual developers, and Bill Gates himself, that the new development process was going to be prohibitively difficult to work within. Changes at the build labs also resulted in a period of several months where no builds of Longhorn were leaked onto the Internet.

=== Longhorn "Omega-13" or Milestone 8/9 ===
Build 3790.1232 (winmain) (build date of August 19, 2004) is notable, as it was the first build of Longhorn based on the pre-release Windows Server 2003 Service Pack 1 codebase rather than the Windows .NET Server Release Candidate 1 codebase of previous Longhorn builds prior to the development reset. It reuses the Windows XP interface. It was also the first build to be built on the newly-renamed "winmain" branch rather than the old "main" branch as used on previous builds of Windows. Successive internal builds over several months gradually integrated a lot of the fundamental work that had been done over the previous three years, but with much stricter rules about what code could be brought into the main builds. Builds in this period were described variously as Longhorn "Omega-13" and/or as Milestone 8/9, depending on whether the new or old build tree was being worked on.

Screenshot of an "Omega-13" Windows Longhorn build (Build 5001)

Builds 5000 and 5001 (vbl_core and winmain respectively) (build dates of August 3, 2004 and September 27, 2004, respectively, both leaked on January 23, 2020) are the other Windows Longhorn builds that used Windows XP interfaces. In these builds, references to "Windows XP" in some places (such as Winver) were hastily replaced with "Windows LH" ("LH" stands for "Longhorn"). In build 5001, a modified version of Windows XP's default wallpaper that implements a Texas Longhorn bull in a humorous manner (in reference to the project's codename) as well as the introduction of a highly unstable version of Windows Media Player 10 are also notable. These hastily made rebrands raised concerns about the authenticity of the builds prior to the leak, as well as several forum threads claiming that the images published by the original leaker of the build were false.

Build 5048 (winmain_idx02) (build date of April 1, 2005) was the official WinHEC 2005 preview build, described as the Longhorn Developer Preview, and made available to WinHEC attendees on April 24, 2005. It was the only build from this period that was made available by Microsoft; it was not officially distributed outside of WinHEC, however the build quickly appeared on file-sharing networks. The Aero visual style made its first appearance in this build, and the Desktop Window Manager was present but disabled and hidden by default. It also introduced new SKUs to replace the ones found in Windows XP (build 5048 identifies itself as "Ultimate", a newly introduced SKU that includes all of the features from the consumer, business and enterprise SKUs) as well as an early version of the Windows System Assessment Tool that can only do memory and disk assessments. The checked/debug version was leaked in December 2021.

At the keynote presentation, Bill Gates also announced that many of the WinFX developer APIs that were originally planned exclusively for Longhorn was going to be backported to Windows XP and Server 2003 and that the final user interfaces for Longhorn would not be seen for a while longer. Other features such as device-independent resolutions, rasterized icons, virtual folders, and registry virtualization were discussed as well.

Build 5048's closer resemblance to Windows XP than to the prior Longhorn builds from 2003 and 2004 surprised many, leading well-known Windows enthusiast Paul Thurrott to write: "My thoughts are not positive, not positive at all. This is a painful build to have to deal with after a year of waiting, a step back in some ways. I hope Microsoft has surprises up their sleeves. This has the makings of a train wreck." Months later, Thurrott stated that the Vista development process has since recovered in the more recent builds.

Build 5060 (Pre-beta 1) (vbl_wcp_avalon) (build date of April 17, 2005) was shown at WinHEC 2005 alongside other builds and featured no major differences to Build 5048 aside from a new logon screen and default desktop wallpaper. The Aero glass theme was refined and looked similar to the one used in the final release of Vista. These new features were carried over to later builds.

== Mid-2005 to November 2006: Windows Vista ==
Microsoft considered several names for its new operating system. In the end, Microsoft chose Windows Vista as confirmed on July 22, 2005, believing it to be a "wonderful intersection of what the product does, what Windows stands for, and what resonates with customers, and their needs." Group Project Manager Greg Sullivan told Paul Thurrott—"You want the PC to adapt to you and help you cut through the clutter to focus on what’s important to you. That's what Windows Vista is all about: "bringing clarity to your world." (a reference to the three marketing points of Vista—Clear, Connected, Confident), so you can focus on what matters to you." Microsoft co-president Jim Allchin also liked the name, saying that "Vista" creates the right imagery for the new product capabilities and inspires the imagination with all the possibilities of what can be done with Windows—making people's passions come alive."

=== Beta 1 ===
Build 5098 (winmain_beta1) (build date of June 28, 2005) includes most of the new features that will later be seen in Beta 1, but still identifies itself as Longhorn.

Windows Vista Beta 1 (build 5112 (winmain_beta1), build date of July 20, 2005) which was released on July 27, 2005, was the first Longhorn build to be called Windows Vista and was available to Microsoft Developer Network (MSDN) and TechNet subscribers as well as a select group of Microsoft Beta testers.

Compared with the WinHEC build released earlier in the year, Vista Beta 1 was a large advancement in introducing new user interface features. The Windows Shell has drastically changed yet again, introducing virtual folders, a new search interface, several new high-resolution icons, and a revamped Windows Explorer interface that did away with the menus and most of the toolbar buttons that were present in previous versions. Beta 1 also introduced many of the underlying technologies slated for Vista, including the new networking and audio stacks, parental controls, and fairly complete working build of .NET Framework 3.0, then still referred to as WinFX.

Build 5212 (build date of July 26, 2005), was leaked in December 2016. This build included gadgets.

Build 5215 (build date of August 7, 2005), was leaked in December 2021. This build included an edition mention in the winver banner on the Starter/Ultimate editions.

=== Community Technology Previews ===
From 2005 to 2006, Microsoft started releasing regular Community Technical Previews (CTP) to beta testers, with less stability work made to them than actual betas.

Build 5219 (build date of August 30, 2005), also known as CTP1 and September CTP, was distributed among 2005 PDC attendees on September 13, 2005, and has been released to Microsoft Beta testers and MSDN subscribers. This was the first public "Ultimate Edition" build, and included Super Fetch.

Although not enabled by default, this refresh saw the return of the Windows Sidebar, which had been removed as part of the development reset, and the introduction of Desktop Gadgets, both of which are part of Microsoft gadgets line of mini-applications. Microsoft stated that they intended to make additional gadgets available for download from a website over time. This build also supported a new version of Windows Media Center code-named "Diamond".

Although Microsoft had stated that WinFS will not make its debut in Windows Vista, users of build 5219 noticed that WinFS was included in that version. Several Windows 'rumor' sites and newsgroups such as Neowin and Paul Thurrott's SuperSite for Windows speculated that WinFS would in fact be ready on time for Windows Vista's release.

Build 5231 (build date of October 4, 2005), also known as CTP2 or the October 2005 CTP, was released to MSDN subscribers and Microsoft Beta Testers on October 17, 2005. This "Ultimate" build introduced Windows Media Player version 11. An updated volume control utility was added, that could control the volume level of every running program.

Build 5259 (built on November 17, 2005) was released to Microsoft Technology Adoption Program (TAP) members on November 22, 2005. It was originally announced to be released on November 18 as a November CTP. Microsoft canceled the November CTP due to its instability, however, and released this build only to TAP members. The sidebar was temporarily removed; the build had a few new UI changes, including the ability to change the color and clarity of the UI. Windows AntiSpyware (soon to be "Windows Defender") was integrated. Outlook Express was renamed "Windows Mail". It was an IDW build and therefore had not gone through the CTP testing process. It leaked to the Internet on December 7, 2005.

December CTP (built on December 14, 2005, with a build number of 5270), was released to testers and MSDN on December 19, 2005, and was very close to feature complete. Since then, the feature-complete build was delayed until late January 2006. In this build, Windows AntiSpyware was renamed Windows Defender, the start button was also changed, IE7 had a new icon/logo, and the Windows XP sounds remained the same. There were some minor UI changes.

The December CTP was also the last build of Windows Vista that supported the bypassing of the WDDM driver model requirement, hence allowing the Desktop Window Manager (UXSS at the time of the build) to run using software vertex emulation. Because of this change past this build, the well-known keys 'UseMachineCheck' and 'EnableMachineCheck do not allow running the Desktop Window Manager in software emulation mode. Running the Desktop Window Manager in software-based mode would eventually appear on Windows 8 nearly seven years later.

Build 5284 (built on December 18, 2005) was the last build to be compiled in 2005, and to have at least one Longhorn reference. It was also the earliest build to include Hold 'Em (known as "Windows Poker" in this build), which is a Texas hold 'em-style poker game that was planned to be included by default in the Home Premium and Ultimate editions of Windows Vista but was removed in later builds before its release due to some apparent "political sensitivity" issues related to its gambling nature; it was later included in the final release as an additional feature in the Windows Ultimate Extras package for the Ultimate edition of Vista.

February CTP (built on February 17, 2006, with a build number of 5308.17), was released on February 22, 2006, and was the first feature-complete CTP. This build was meant for enterprises. It was also the first build to have the upgrade compatibility. This build, according to Microsoft, had all but one feature (which should appear in the next CTP) that customers will see in the final release. However, later builds brought more improvements than previously expected. An unstaged revision was made to this build and was released on February 28, 2006, as build 5308.60 (built on February 23), which was released as a result of Windows Server "Longhorn" having many issues. The February CTP also incorporated numerous virtual folders including Attachments, Favorite Music, Fresh Tracks, Important E-mail, Last 7 Days E-mail, Last 30 Days Documents, Last 30 Days Pictures And Videos, Recently Changed, Shared By Me, Unread E-mail, and User's Files.

At the Intel Developer Forum on March 9, 2006, Microsoft announced a change in its plans to support EFI in Windows Vista. The UEFI 2.0 specification (which replaces EFI 1.10) was not completed until early 2006, and at the time of Microsoft's announcement, no firmware manufacturers had completed a production implementation which could be used for testing. As a result, the decision was made to postpone the introduction of UEFI support to Windows; support for UEFI on 64-bit platforms was postponed until Vista Service Pack 1 and Windows Server 2008 and 32-bit UEFI will not be supported, as Microsoft does not expect many such systems to be built as the market moves to 64-bit processors. 32-bit UEFI was later supported with release of Windows 8 in 2012.

February CTP Refresh (built on March 21, 2006, with a build number of 5342.2) was released March 24, 2006. This build was shipped to technical beta testers and some corporate customers by Microsoft and was being used as a testing board for the extensive feedback they got from the February CTP. They described this release as an "External Developer Workstation", with the intent of providing an interim build between CTPs. Microsoft claimed it was still on track to deliver the next CTP in the second quarter, the build that will be the last in the Beta 2 fork. The build included minor UI changes, most notably improvements to the Media Center, new Aero and Aurora effects, a faster setup process, some new Sidebar gadgets, and slight improvements in overall performance and stability. The paint was also slightly improved, there's a new screenshot snapping/saving tool included and a slightly redesigned Network Center. This build did not meet CTP quality measurements, and was available only in Ultimate Edition, for both 32-bit (x86) and 64-bit (x64) systems.

=== Beta 2 ===
April EDW (built on April 19, 2006, with a build number of 5365), which was released on April 21, 2006, introduced more changes to visual user interface elements, and to the behavior of User Account Control. A number of new backgrounds were also introduced, and two new screensavers were added as well. The Sidebar was enabled by default, as was automatic defragmentation of the hard drive. Hold 'Em, a game that shipped with some previous CTPs since build 5284, was dropped in this build due to apparent "political sensitivity" issues related to its gambling nature; Microsoft now offers it as a separate web download for Windows Vista Ultimate users in the form of Windows Ultimate Extras.

Windows Vista Beta 2 Preview (built on May 1, 2006, with a build number of 5381) was officially released on May 6, 2006, to Microsoft's technical beta testers. It featured mostly performance tweaks and only a few minor changes compared to build 5365. With this build, Microsoft entered Beta 2 "escrow".

Windows Vista Beta 2 (built on May 18, 2006, with a build number of 5384), was released to Microsoft Developer Network subscribers (the first since 5308) and Microsoft Connect testers on May 23, 2006, in conjunction with Bill Gates's keynote presentation at the WinHEC 2006 conference. On June 6, Microsoft extended the availability of Beta 2 to all users, making Vista available as a free download in several languages from their website. Some technology websites described this release as "the largest download event in software history".

In June, Microsoft made two significant changes to its plans for Windows Vista. One issue, the inclusion of Open XML Paper Specification support in Vista and Microsoft Office 2007, had become a major point of dispute with Adobe Systems. When it was first introduced May 2005, XPS (known at the time as "Metro") was characterized as a "PDF-killer", but an Adobe representative stated that they were "not threatened" by its addition to "Longhorn". However, a year later, Adobe had changed their stance and saw the inclusion of the new document format as an anti-competitive attack on their Portable Document Format. While Microsoft refused to remove XPS altogether, noting that it is at the core of Vista's print spooling system, they have offered the ability to system builders and OEMs to remove any user-visible aspects of the document format from the operating system. A few days later, it was announced that PC-to-PC Sync would not ship with Windows Vista.

On June 14, 2006, Windows developer Philip Su posted a blog entry that decried the development process of Windows Vista, stating that "the code is way too complicated, and that the pace of coding has been tremendously slowed down by the overbearing process. " The same post also described Windows Vista as having approximately 50 million lines of code, with about 2,000 developers working on the product.

=== Pre-RC1 ===
Build 5456 (build date of June 20, 2006) was released on June 24, 2006. Some of the new features included a revamped Aero subsystem and a completely overhauled and significantly less obtrusive User Account Control interface. "List view" in Windows Explorer was brought back, after having been removed in Beta 1. Microsoft developer Ben Betz later explained in a blog entry that, while they felt that removing List mode made sense based on usability research and its inability to support Windows Explorer's new "grouping" feature, the feature was restored based on a great deal of feedback from beta testers.

The release notes for the build state that the Time Zone bug that plagued almost all previous builds of Windows Vista had been patched, and quite a few issues in the Regional Settings and IME had also been resolved. A new "Windows Aero" mouse pointer scheme was introduced, which introduced anti-aliasing to the mouse pointer for the first time, and many of the remaining Windows XP-style icons have been replaced with new icons. The disk space used by a clean installation was also significantly reduced.

Build 5472 (build date of July 13, 2006) was released on July 17, 2006. Aside from incorporating several bug fixes and localization improvements, the build also introduced a revised "Basic" theme that replaces the gray theme seen in previous builds with a light blue theme. The Network Center was significantly revised as well, collating more status information in one place, and reducing the number of steps to get to most configuration options. More desktop backgrounds and icons were introduced, and Flip3D saw some layout tweaks. A new "Windows Aero" mouse cursor is set by default. The build was a huge performance improvement over Beta 2 and was comparable to and possibly even faster than that of Windows XP.

During a demonstration of the speech recognition feature new to Windows Vista at Microsoft's Financial Analyst Meeting on July 27, 2006, the software recognized the phrase "Dear mom" as "Dear aunt". After several failed attempts to correct the error, the sentence eventually became "Dear aunt, let's set so double the killer delete select all". A developer with Vista's speech recognition team later explained that there was a bug with the build of Vista that was causing the microphone gain level to be set very high, resulting in the audio being received by the speech recognition software to be "incredibly distorted".

On August 8, 2006, the Microsoft Security Response Center provided "critical" security fixes for Windows Vista Beta 2, making it the first Microsoft product to get security updates while still in beta.

Build 5536 (build date of August 21, 2006) was released on August 24, 2006, and between August 29 and August 31 to the first 100,000 users who downloaded it from the Microsoft site. Among notable changes, it featured new ties to the Windows Live online services by new icons in the Welcome Center, minor updates to the Aero appearance with a slightly more bluish tint to the glass effect, big speed improvements (including setup speed), many bug fixes and further tweaked anti-aliasing in the Flip 3D feature. It was released publicly on August 29, 2006.

=== RC1 ===
Release Candidate 1 (RC1) (built on August 29, 2006, with a build number of 5600.16384) was released to a select group of beta testers on September 1, 2006. On September 6, RC1 was released to MSDN and Technet subscribers, as well as registered Customer Preview Program (CPP) members with Beta 2 PID's. On September 14, Microsoft re-opened the CPP to new members. The CPP ended on November 26, 2006.

The public release of Release Candidate 1 resulted in a number of extensive reviews and analyses on various technology news websites, both immediately after its release, and in the weeks following. Ars Technica's Ken Fisher wrote that performance had improved significantly over Beta 2, suggesting that faster machines may perform better than Windows XP; he also criticised the usefulness of the Windows Sidebar and the continued intrusiveness of User Account Control. CRN's review noted five specific categories of improvements to Release Candidate 1: Installation speed, device driver support, performance improvements in several components, security, and multimedia capabilities. Criticism of Vista's user interface arose as well, with Chris Pirillo describing the near-final state as "sloppy."

=== Pre-RC2 ===
Build 5700 (winmain) (build date of August 10, 2006), the first build of the RTM branch, was shown at the Student Day Presentation of Microsoft Tech-Ed 2006 in Australia. It appeared to run faster than the previous Pre-RC1 build 5472 with a few UI improvements.

A higher build number does not necessarily indicate a newer build. Microsoft began work on the RTM branch at the same time as it was wrapping up the RC1 branch, allowing for mainstream RC1 developers to more easily "flow" into the new development stage. This parallel development helps explain why build 5700 is older than even some pre-RC1 builds.

Build 5728 (winmain_idx06) (build date of September 17, 2006) was released on September 22, 2006, to technical beta participants. The following day, Microsoft released a 32-bit version of the build to the public, with a 64-bit version arriving on September 25. On October 1, Microsoft reached its goals for program participation and no longer offered the build to the public. In response to a significant amount of feedback from RC1 testers, 5728 contained many improvements, one of which was the inclusion of a check box in the Sound properties that allowed the user to disable the Windows Vista startup sound. The Welcome Center was also improved with new icons, eliminating the use of one icon for several different items, and all of the old icons in the User folder were replaced. With this build, Microsoft neared its goal of Vista installing in 15 minutes, with some reviewers reporting that 5728 took as little as 16 minutes to do a clean install. However, performing an upgrade installation from Windows XP was still slow, sometimes taking more than an hour to complete.

=== RC2 ===
Release Candidate 2 (RC2) (vista_rtm_edw) (built on October 3, 2006, with a build number of 5744.16384), was released to CPP members, TAP testers, MSDN/Technet subscribers, and other technical beta testers on Friday, October 6, 2006, and was available for download until October 9 in preparation for the final release of Windows Vista. Because of an aggressive development schedule, this was the final build that would be officially released to the general public for testing. Nevertheless, all pre-release product keys will work until the final RTM build. Several testers reported that RC2 was faster and more stable than build 5728. However, because RC2, which was a regular interim build, and not a major milestone as the name suggests, was not as rigorously tested as RC1, RC1 may have been more stable in certain situations. This build fixed many compatibility issues that plagued previous builds. Vista's GUI, which continued to be improved, contained some minor tweaks, one of the more prominent of which was the new ability to customize the color, but not the transparency, of maximized windows. In previous builds, windows became predominantly black when maximized, an effect that could not be altered by users. A Control Panel icon for Windows Sideshow was also added.

=== Pre-RTM ===
Because a release to manufacturing (RTM) build is the final version of code shipped to retailers and other distributors, the purpose of a pre-RTM build is to eliminate any last "show-stopper" bugs that may prevent the code from responsibly being shipped to customers, as well as anything else that consumers may find annoying. Thus, it is unlikely that any major new features will be introduced; instead, work will focus on Vista's "fit-and-finish". In just a few days, developers had managed to drop Vista's bug count from over 2470 on September 22 to just over 1400 by the time RC2 shipped in early October. However, they still had a way to go before Vista was ready for RTM. Microsoft's internal processes required Vista's bug count to drop to 500 or fewer before the product could go into escrow for RTM. For most of these builds, only 32-bit versions were released.

Build 5808 (vista_rtm) (build date of October 12, 2006) was released to TAP testers on October 19, 2006. This build was notable because it was the first build released to testers since Microsoft entered RTM "escrow". This explains why the build numbers jumped from 57xx to 58xx.

Build 5824 (vista_rtm) (build date of October 17, 2006) was an interim RTM "escrow" build of Vista released to testers in October 2006.

Windows Vista Launch Preview (vista_rtm) (built on October 18, 2006, with a build number of 5840.16384) was released to testers in October 2006. It was mostly similar to build 5824 with a few fixes to eliminate some "show-stopper" bugs in the OOBE from the previous build and was the last build to use the Windows XP sounds.

Build 5840.16389 (vista_rtm) (build date of October 24, 2006) contained a large number of new and final icons, as well as a new set of final wallpapers, including a new default wallpaper based on the Aurora "swoosh" seen in prior builds. It was the first build to use the Windows Vista sounds; the Windows XP sounds were removed.

=== RTM ===
Screenshot of Windows Vista RTM (Build 6000)

Release to Manufacturing (RTM) (vista_rtm) (built on November 1, 2006, with a build number of 6000.16386) is the final release of Windows Vista that ships to customers. The RTM's build number jumped to 6000 to reflect Vista's internal version number, NT 6.0. Jumping RTM build numbers was a common practice for most consumer-oriented Windows versions such as Windows 98 (b.1998), Windows 98 SE (b.2222), Windows Me (b.3000) or Windows XP (b.2600), as opposed to business-oriented Windows versions such as Windows NT 4.0 (b.1381), Windows 2000 (b.2195) or Server 2003 (b.3790).

Microsoft announced this build had been finalized on November 8, 2006, after over five years of development. On November 16, 2006, Microsoft made the final build available to MSDN and Technet Plus subscribers. A business-oriented Enterprise edition was made available to volume license customers on November 30. Windows Vista was launched for general customer availability on January 30, 2007.

== Mid-2007 to February 2008: Service Pack 1 ==
Service Pack 1 Beta was only released on Microsoft Connect to selected testers on September 24, 2007. This build was offered optionally through Windows Update through a registry key installed by the tester. This key was later leaked to the net resulting in its deactivation by Microsoft. With this release, the build number for Vista jumped to 6001.16659.070916-1443. This build also removed the Group Policy Management Console (GPMC) from client computers, to be replaced by a downloadable version at a later date. Also removed was the "Search" menu option from the right-hand bar of the start menu (including the option to re-add it from the Start Menu customization list). This build broke the "HP Touch smart" family of applications, and also caused bugs with resuming from sleep, and in some cases rendered some 64-bit PCs with Trusted Platform Module (TPM) chips unable to finish booting. This build also contained unspecified improvements in Speed and responsiveness of the OS.

Service Pack 1 Release Candidate Preview was only released on Microsoft Connect to selected testers on November 12, 2007. With this release, the build number for Vista increased to 6001.17042.071107.1618. Changes in this build are covered by the Microsoft Connect Non-Disclosure agreement (NDA).

Service Pack 1 Release Candidate was first released to Microsoft Connect testers on December 4, 2007, with the same build released on MSDN and TechNet several weeks later. A few days after that, this build was released to the public officially on the Microsoft download center as a Public Preview of SP1. With this release, the build number of Vista increased to 6001.17052.071129.2315. This build contained several notable changes and enhancements.

Service Pack 1 Release Candidate Refresh was released on Microsoft Connect to selected testers on January 9, 2008 and was released to the public on January 11, 2008. This release has a build number of 6001.17128.080101.1935.

Service Pack 1 Release Candidate Refresh 2 was only released on Microsoft Connect to selected testers on January 24, 2008, in preparation for the final release of Service Pack 1 – through Windows Update only. This release has a build number of 6001.18000. Details of this build are covered by the Microsoft Connect Non-Disclosure agreement (NDA).

Microsoft announced that Service Pack 1 had been finalized on February 4, 2008, only 1 year after Vista's general availability. The final build of Service Pack 1 went live on Tuesday, March 18, 2008, over the Microsoft Download Center, and Windows Update. This build has been confirmed by sources at Microsoft as being the same code as RC Refresh 2, also giving it the same build number. The full build string of both this release and Refresh 2 is "6001.18000.longhorn_rtm.080118-1840".

== Post-Service Pack 1 ==
Build 6001.18063 (release date of June 24, 2008). Microsoft Released KB952709 as a Reliability and Performance update for Windows Vista this build is notable for two reasons. First, This is the first publicly released update that increases Vista build number beyond the 6001.18000 (final) build of Service Pack 1. Second, this build replaces the 6001. longhorn_rtm.080118-1840 build a string of SP1 with 6001.vistasp1_gdr.080425-1930. The longhorn build string was present during the early development of Vista but was not seen in the official release build or any update after until it was reintroduced during the SP1 beta and was left in when SP1 was released, this build marks its removal from the only release version of Vista to contain the longhorn codename prominently.

== Late 2008 to April 2009: Service Pack 2 ==
Microsoft started work on Service Pack 2 soon after Service Pack 1 was released, as Windows Server 2008 uses the same codebase as Windows Vista Service Pack 1. Service Pack 2 is the last service pack to be released for both Windows Server 2008 and Windows Vista simultaneously, sharing the same binary.

Name	Build number	Details
Windows Vista Service Pack 2 Pre-Beta	6002.16489.lh_sp2beta.080924-1740 (Version 105)	Released in October 2008.
Windows Vista Service Pack 2 Beta	6002.16497.081017-1605 (Version 113)	Released December 4, 2008. The download became available in the Microsoft Download Center.
Windows Vista Service Pack 2 RC Escrow	6002.16659.090114-1728 (Version 275)	Released in January 2009.
Windows Vista Service Pack 2 Release Candidate	6002.16670.090130-1715 (Version 286)	Released in February 2009.
Windows Vista Service Pack 2 RTM Escrow (for the beta testers of Microsoft Connect)	6002.17043.090312-1835	Released March 2009. Available and can be installed via Windows Update
Windows Vista Service Pack 2 RTM Escrow	6002.17506.090313-1730	Released March 2009. Leak to file-sharing websites.
Windows Vista Service Pack 2 RTM	6002.18005.090410-1830	Released 28 April 2009. Officially released by Microsoft via Windows Update on 26 May 2009.

== See also ==
- Windows 7
- Development of Windows XP
- Development of Windows 95
- History of Microsoft Windows
