= GNOME Storage =

GNOME Storage was a project to replace the traditional file system with a new document store. Storage was part of a larger design for a new desktop environment that was still under development. The current implementation includes natural language access and network transparency.

Storage is no longer being developed; its CVS tree has not been changed for several years. Since the introduction of Storage, desktop search came to prominence, and now GNOME desktop search projects (Beagle, also defunct, as well as Tracker, formerly MetaTracker) have largely supplanted the need for Storage.

== See also ==
- WinFS, a Microsoft project with similar goals
