= Brian LaMacchia =

Computer security specialist

Brian A. LaMacchia is a computer security specialist.

LaMacchia is currently the Executive Director of the MPC Alliance. LaMacchia was previously a Distinguished Engineer at Microsoft and headed the Security and Cryptography team within Microsoft Research (MSR). His team’s main project was the development of quantum-resistant public-key cryptographic algorithms and protocols. Brian was also a founding member of the Microsoft Cryptography Review Board and consulted on security and cryptography architectures, protocols, and implementations across the company; previously, he was the Director of Security and Cryptography in the Microsoft Extreme Computing Group. He played a leading role in the design of XKMS, the security architecture for .NET and Palladium. He designed and led the development team for the .NET security architecture. He was a security architect on Palladium. LaMacchia was originally well known for his work at the Massachusetts Institute of Technology, establishing the MIT PGP Key Server, the first key-centric PKI implementation to see wide-scale use. LaMacchia wrote the first Web interface for a PGP Key Server. He is a submitter of the Frodo post-quantum proposal to the NIST Post-Quantum Cryptography Standardization project.

His leadership has also been recognized by his membership in the Computing Community Consortium (CCC) Council.

He has played a leading role in the design of W3C XMLDsig and XKMS standards. In particular, he is an author of versions 1.0, 1.1 and 2.0 XMLDsig. He is a contributor to XKMS. He is a coauthor on the OASIS standard WS-SECURITY.

LaMacchia earned S.B., S.M., and Ph.D. degrees from MIT in 1990, 1991, and 1996, respectively.

As of 2024, LaMacchia is serving his third three-year term as Treasurer of the International Association for Cryptologic Research. He first joined the IACR Board of Directors in 2015 as General Chair of CRYPTO 2016. LaMacchia also serves as a member of the Board of Directors of Seattle Opera. He previously served for ten years as member of the board of directors of the Seattle International Film Festival, including the 2015-2016 term as president of SIFF.
