= Peter Biddle =

American technical evangelist

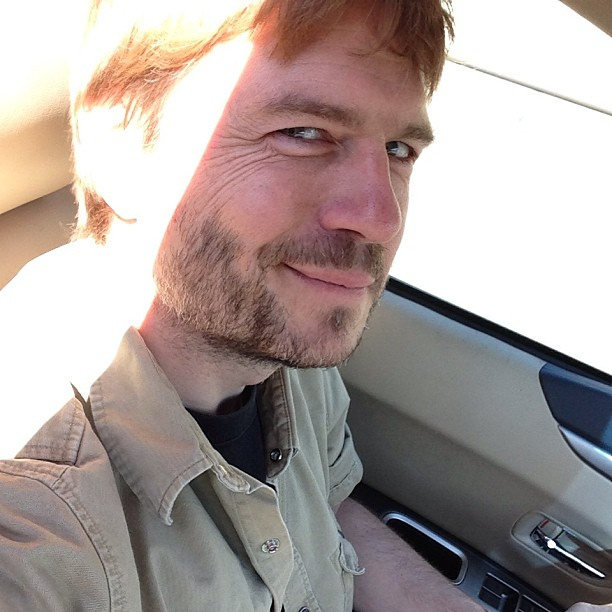
Biddle in 2013

Peter Nicholas Biddle (born December 22, 1966) is a technology evangelist from the United States. His primary fields of interest while employed at major technology companies such as Intel and Microsoft were content distribution, secure computing, and encryption. Since his departure from Intel, he has co-founded and led several industrial design companies.

== Software career ==
Biddle joined Microsoft in 1990 as a Support Engineer. He was one of the first authors to describe the concept of darknet, an early participant in the Secure Digital Music Initiative (SDMI), Copy Protection Technical Working Group, and Trusted Computing Platform Alliance, an early technical evangelist for DVD and digital video recorder technology, the founding leader of Microsoft's Next-Generation Secure Computing Base (code named Palladium) initiative, and was responsible for starting Microsoft's Hypervisor development efforts.

Biddle built and led the engineering team that shipped BitLocker Drive Encryption, a Trusted Platform Module-rooted disk encryption for Windows Vista. Bitlocker continues to be used by Microsoft today, having been shipped with certain versions of Windows 7 Ultimate, Windows 8, Windows 8.1 and Windows Server 2008 and later.

In 1998, Biddle publicly demonstrated real-time consumer digital video recorder functionality using an inexpensive MPEG2 hardware encoder, at the WinHEC conference during a speech by Bill Gates. Biddle was the author of the diagram on page 13 in the SDMI specification, which enabled the playback of unknown or unlicensed content on SDMI-compliant players, and was a vocal proponent within SDMI for the external validation of digital watermarking.

On August 8, 2007, London-based company Trampoline Systems, a company exploring what they called The Enterprise 2.0 space announced Biddle would be moving to London to join them as Vice President of Development after leaving Microsoft. While at Trampoline, Biddle ran all product development and engineering efforts.

In 2008, Biddle joined Intel Corporation as a director of the Google program office. During his tenure at Intel, he also served in other positions, including evangelist and General Manager of Intel's AppUp digital storefront, which was shuttered in 2014 after four years' operation, Director of the Intel Atom Developer Program, described as "...a framework for developers to create and sell software applications for netbooks with support for handhelds and smart phones available in the future", and General Manager of Intel's Cloud Services Platform.

In 2009 he became a surprise witness in the RealNetworks, Inc. v. DVD Copy Control Association, Inc. case where, as one of the drafters of the CSS license, he served as an expert on certain CSS licensing issues at the heart of the case.

For more than 3 years during Biddle's tenure at Intel, he hosted the podcast "MashUp Radio", an online publication sponsored by Intel.

== Industrial Design Career ==
In 2014, Biddle founded TradLabs, a company that designed new hardware intended to make outdoor sports safer and more accessible.

Biddle became CIO of Modica Microindustries in 2019. Modica builds interconnected systems for micromanufacturing and houses their systems in re-purposed and re-built metal shipping containers. In 2021, Modica was accepted into the STANLEY + Techstars accelerator program focused on AI in advanced manufacturing. The company billed itself as "building a self healing and self organizing factory-as-a-service platform for deployment anywhere on earth and (eventually) in space."

== Personal life ==
Biddle is a member of the Biddle family of Philadelphia and is a descendant of Nicholas Biddle, whose name he bears as his middle name. Other notable Biddles include Charles Biddle, Vice President of Pennsylvania and Mary Duke Biddle Trent Semans an American heiress and philanthropist.
