= Professional Developers Conference =

Former series of conferences by Microsoft

Microsoft PDC
- Status: Merged with MIX to form the Build Conference in 2011
- Frequency: Annual
- Venue: Seattle Convention Center and Digital
- Locations: Anaheim, California; Redmond, Washington; San Francisco, California; Seattle, Washington
- Years active: 1992–2010
- Founded: July 1992; 34 years ago
- Most recent: October 28–29, 2010

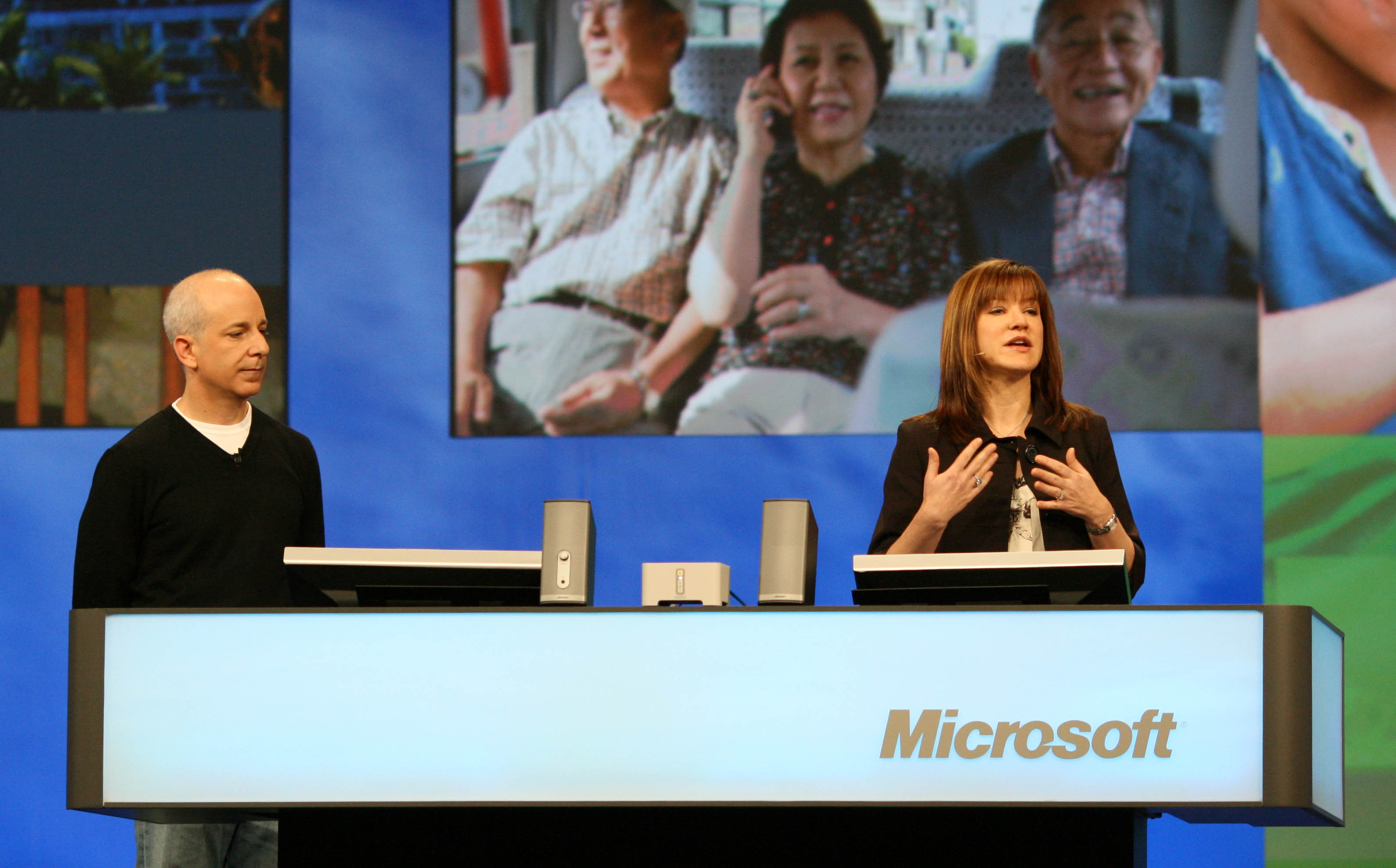
Steven Sinofsky and Julie Larson-Green presenting at PDC 2008

Microsoft's Professional Developers Conference (PDC) was a series of conferences for software developers; the conference was held infrequently to coincide with beta releases of the Windows operating system, and showcased topics of interest to those developing hardware and software for the new version of Windows.

In 2011, PDC was merged with Microsoft's web development conference MIX to form the Build Conference.

== Events ==
- July 1992 - Moscone Center in San Francisco, California
  - Known as Win32 Professional Developers Conference
  - First demonstration of the Win32 API and first mention of "Chicago", which would eventually become Windows 95
  - Estimated attendance of over 5,000 developers
  - Windows NT 3.1 Preliminary Release for Developers (build 297) was sent to all conference attendees
- December 1993 - Anaheim Convention Center in Anaheim, California
  - Windows "Chicago"
  - Win32 and Object Linking and Embedding version 2
  - Estimated attendance of over 8,000
  - Cairo public demonstration, including the Object File System
- March 1996 - Moscone Center in San Francisco, California
  - Microsoft demonstrated the power of new tools, renamed ActiveX
  - Microsoft and other industry leaders presented VBScript, an implementation of OLE Scripting; ActiveX Controls, for embedding OLE Controls into HTML documents; ActiveX Conferencing, which enables sharing data as well as applications over TCP/IP; the Internet Control Pack, allowing developers to make their applications Internet aware; and numerous other ActiveX technologies.
- November, 1996 - Long Beach, California November 3–7, 1996
- September 1997 - San Diego Convention Center in San Diego, California
  - First demonstrations of Windows NT 5.0, release of Beta 1 to developers
  - Estimated attendance of 6,200
- October 11–15, 1998 - Colorado Convention Center, Denver, Colorado
  - Windows NT 5.0, the release of Beta 2 to developers.
  - Windows DNA technology announced, including COM+

=== 2000-2009 ===
- July 11–14, 2000 - Orange County Convention Center in Orlando, Florida
  - .NET Framework and Visual Studio .NET announced, initial beta release given to attendees
  - C# programming language announced and demonstrated
  - ASP+, the successor to Active Server Pages was announced; this was renamed ASP.NET later in the year
  - Announcement of the end of the Windows 9x line, culminating with a planned 2002 release of a new operating system, "Whistler"
  - Internet Explorer 5.5 was released
  - Estimated attendance of 6,000 developers
- October 22–26, 2001 - Los Angeles Convention Center in Los Angeles, California
  - Release candidates of the .NET Framework and Visual Studio .NET were announced during Bill Gates' keynote.
  - Windows XP was officially released.
  - Introduction of Tablet PC, including a software development kit.
  - .NET My Services (codenamed HailStorm) announced.
  - .NET Compact Framework introduced.
  - First discussions of Internet Information Services version 6.
  - Counting Crows performed at the PDC party at the Staples Center.
- October 27–30, 2003 - Los Angeles Convention Center in Los Angeles, California
  - Windows Longhorn revealed - Avalon, Aero, Indigo, WinFS
- September 13–16, 2005 - Los Angeles Convention Center in Los Angeles, California
  - Windows Vista build 5219 handed out to attendees
  - Internet Explorer 7 demoed
  - Office 12 demoed with ribbon bar
  - .NET 2.0
- October 27–30, 2008 - Los Angeles Convention Center in Los Angeles, California.
  - First demonstration of Windows 7 as well as Office 14 for the Web .
  - Introduction of Windows Azure, Microsoft's data center hosting platform.
  - Outlook to .NET 4.0, Visual Studio 2010 and a new .NET Application Server (codenamed "Dublin").
  - Release of Microsoft Surface SDK and first demonstration of SecondLight, a next generation Surface prototype.
- November 17–20, 2009 - Los Angeles Convention Center in Los Angeles, California
  - Vision of Three Screens and a Cloud
  - Emergence of Windows Azure with billed, commercial service to begin in February 2010.
  - Many back-end announcements:
    - Microsoft AppFabric, based on the earlier .NET Application Server and the caching technology (formerly codenamed "Velocity").
    - Microsoft SQL Server Modeling Services (SSModS) released (formerly codenamed "Oslo")
    - BizTalk Server 2009 R2 announced with new features like an improved mapper for early 2010 release
  - Many front-end announcements:
    - Release of first public betas for Microsoft Office 2010, Microsoft Silverlight 4
    - Early revelations about Microsoft Internet Explorer 9 and its objective of better Acid3 performance and HTML5/CSS3 compliance.
  - A special "PDC 2009" Acer 1420p Multi-touch Tablet PC was given out to all attendees (the BIOS referencing MSFT in the 'about' information.)
- October 28–29, 2010 - Microsoft Campus in Redmond, Washington
  - Announced new Platform Features for Cloud Computing
  - VmRoles announced to port existing on-premises Applications to the Cloud
  - Microsoft "Dallas" renamed to Windows Azure Marketplace DataMarket
  - Windows Azure Marketplace Applications announced
  - An unlocked Windows Phone 7 smartphone was given out to all attendees
  - Microsoft limited the number of attendees to 1,000
  - Many public viewing events all over the globe (e.g. Tokyo, London, Cologne, Vienna)

== Other Microsoft developer conferences ==
- Microsoft Build (merged from MIX and PDC)
- Microsoft Ignite (formerly Microsoft TechEd)
- Dev Connections
- PASS
- SQLBits
- VSLive!

== See also ==
- Windows Hardware Engineering Conference (WinHEC)
