= Graphics device interface =

A graphics device interface is a subsystem that most operating systems use for representing graphical objects and transmitting them to output devices such as monitors and printers. In most cases, the graphics device interface is only able to draw 2D graphics and simple 3D graphics, in order to make use of more advanced graphics and keep performance, an API such as DirectX or OpenGL needs to be installed.

In Microsoft Windows, the GDI functionality resides in gdi.exe on 16-bit Windows, and gdi32.dll on 32-bit Windows.
