= SQLBits =

SQLBits is the largest community-led SQL Server and Microsoft Data Platform conference in Europe, founded in 2007 by a group of individuals who are passionate about the Microsoft SQL Server and Azure product suite. Volunteers include committee members, speakers, helpers and industry sponsors who come together to provide Microsoft SQL Server education.

SQLBits is now held once a year. Sessions are recorded and hosted on the SQLBits website and are freely available to everyone for download.

One of the key principles of SQLBits is that it is a community led conference that is not located in any one specific area of the UK. Instead, the conference reaches out to the SQL Server community by moving the event around the UK.

There have been 24 SQLBits Conferences to date plus an online only event. The key dates and locations are listed below:

- SQLBits 1 - October 2007, Microsoft UK, Reading, England
- SQLBits 2 - March 2008, Lakeside Conference Centre, Birmingham, England. Theme: The SQL.
- SQLBits 3 - October 2008, University of Hatfield, Hatfield, England. Theme: Cubed.
- SQLBits 4 - March 2009, Manchester Metropolitan University, Manchester, England. Theme: Goes Forth.
- SQLBits 5 - November 2009, Celtic Manor, Newport, Wales. Theme: Goes West.
- SQLBits 6 - April 2010, Church House Conference Centre, Westminster, London, England. Theme: The 6th Sets.
- SQLBits 7 - September 2010, University of York, York, Yorkshire. Theme: The Seven Wonders of SQL.
- SQLBits 8 - April 2011, Brighton Grand Hotel, Brighton, England. Theme: Beside the Seaside.
- SQLBits 9 - September 2011, Britannia Adelphi Hotel, Liverpool, England
- SQLBits 10 - March 2012, Novotel Hotel, Hammersmith, London, England. Theme: Casino.
- SQLBits 11 - May 2013, East Midlands Conference Centre, Nottingham, England. Theme: Robin Hood.
- SQLBits 12 - July 2014, International Centre, Telford, England. Theme: Steam Punk.
- SQLBits 14 - 4–7 March 2015, ExCeL London, England. Theme: Superheroes.
- SQLBits 15 - May 2016, Liverpool Exhibition Centre, England. Theme: Space.
- SQLBits 16 - April 2017, International Centre, Telford, England. Theme: Disco.
- SQLBits 2018 - 21 - 24 February 2018, Olympia, London, England. Theme: It's Magic.
- SQLBits 2019 - 27 February - 2 March 2019, Manchester Central, England. Theme: Speakeasy.
- SQLBits 2020 - 29 October - 3 November 2020, online because of COVID-19. Theme: The Greatest Data Show.
- SQLBits 2022 - 8 - 12 March 2022, ExCeL London, England. Theme: Arcade.
- SQLBits 2023 - 14 - 18 March 2023, International Convention Centre Wales, Wales. Theme: Dungeons and Dragons.
- SQLBits 2024 - 19 - 23 March 2024, Farnborough International Exhibition & Conference Centre. Theme: Aviation.
- SQLBits 2025 - 18 - 21 June 2025, ExCeL London, England. Theme: Neon.
- SQLBits 2026 - 22 - 25 April 2026, International Convention Centre Wales, Wales. Theme: Cartoon.
