= Start menu =

Part of Microsoft Windows user interface

The Start menu (called Start screen in Windows 8, 8.1, Server 2012, and Server 2012 R2) is a graphical user interface element that has been part of Microsoft Windows since Windows 95, providing a means of opening programs and performing other functions in the Windows shell. The Start menu, and the taskbar on which it appears, were created and named in 1993 by Daniel Oran, a program manager at Microsoft who had previously collaborated on great ape language research with the behavioral psychologist B.F. Skinner at Harvard.

The Start menu was renamed Start screen in Windows 8, before returning to its original name with Windows 10. It has been co-opted by some operating systems (like ReactOS) and Linux desktop environments for providing a more Windows-like experience, and as such is, for example, present in KDE Plasma, with the name of Kickoff Application Launcher, and on Xfce with the name of Whisker Menu.

Traditionally, the Start menu provided a customizable nested list of programs for the user to launch, as well as a list of most recently opened documents, a way to find files and obtain assistance, and access to the system settings. Later enhancements via Windows Desktop Update included access to special folders such as "My Documents" and "Favorites" (browser bookmarks). Windows XP's Start menu was expanded to encompass various My Documents folders (including My Music and My Pictures), and transplanted other items like My Computer and My Network Places from the Windows desktop. Until Windows Vista, the Start menu was constantly expanded across the screen as the user navigated through its cascading sub-menus.

== Microsoft Windows ==
In Microsoft Windows, the Start menu in some form appears in Windows 9x, Windows NT 4.0 and all subsequent versions in the Windows NT family, as well as Windows CE, Windows Mobile and Windows Phone.

=== Windows 95–Me ===
The Windows 95 Start menu

The Start menu first appeared in Windows 95. It was made to overcome the shortcomings of Program Manager in previous operating systems. Program Manager consisted of a simple multiple document interface (MDI) which allowed users to open separate "program groups" and then execute the shortcuts to programs contained within. It lacked the ability to nest groups within other groups.

Windows 95 and Windows NT 4.0 replaced the Program Manager with the desktop and Start menu. The latter was comparable in some respects with the Apple menu in Mac OS and did not have the mentioned limitations of Program Manager: Being a menu, it allowed nested grouping while keeping only one group open at the time. The menu also offered the ability to shut down and log off from their computer.

Later developments in Internet Explorer and subsequent Windows releases make it possible to customize the Start menu and to access and expand Internet Explorer Favorites, My Documents and Administrative Tools (Windows 2000 and later) from the Start menu. Items could also be simply added to the Start menu by dragging and dropping them.

Although Windows XP and Windows Server 2003 introduced a new version of Start menu, they offered the ability to switch back to this version of Start menu. This version of the Start menu is also available in Windows Vista and Windows Server 2008. However, it is absent in Windows 7, Windows Server 2008 R2 and other later Windows releases.

=== Windows XP ===
The Start menu in Windows XP

The first major overhaul to the Start menu was introduced in Windows XP and was later included in Windows Server 2003. The Start menu was expanded to two columns: the left-hand column focuses on installed programs, while the right-hand column provides access to My Documents, My Pictures, My Music and other special folders. This column also includes shortcuts for Computer and Network (Network Neighborhood in Windows 95 and 98), which were placed on the Desktop in prior versions of Windows. The contents of this column can be customized. Commonly used programs are automatically displayed in the left-hand menu. Users may opt to "pin" programs to this side of the Start menu so that they are always accessible. A sub-menu item at the bottom of this column grants access to all items of Start menu. When this menu item is selected, a scrolling list of Start menu programs replaces the user/recent list.

=== Windows Vista/7 ===
The Start menu in Windows Vista

The Start menu in Windows 7

Windows Vista and its successors added minor changes to the menu. Prior to Windows Vista and Windows Server 2008, the Start menu consisted of a group of menus and sub-menus that cascaded and expanded, obscuring the initially visible portions of the screen beneath them. In Windows Vista, however, cascading menus were replaced by a sliding window in the left pane of the Start menu. Whenever the All Programs item is clicked, the contents of the left pane slide off the left edge of the Start menu, and the All Programs menu slides in from the right edge of the left column. This menu presents a tree view of its hierarchy that expands towards the bottom, with a vertical scrollbar whenever needed. Also added in Windows Vista is a Search box that allows users to search for the Start menu shortcuts or other files and folders. The search box features incremental search: If indexing is not turned off, the search box returns results on-the-fly as users type into it. Since the found items can be immediately opened, the Start menu search box partially replaces the function of the Run command from previous versions of Windows. The Run command can also be added separately to the right column in the Start menu. In Windows 7 and Windows Server 2008 R2, the search results pane covers both columns of the Start menu. The search box is extended to support searching Control Panel items. The right column in Windows 7 links to Libraries instead of ordinary folders. Most importantly, however, items on the Start menu support Jump lists through cascade buttons on their right. Unlike prior versions, the word "start" is omitted, and the ability to revert to the "Classic" Start menu design is no longer available.

=== Windows 8.x ===
The Start screen in Windows 8

The Start screen in Windows 8.1, with the Power and Search button also visible

The Start menu seen in Windows RT, after Update 3, with a start menu resembling Windows 10

On Windows 8 and Windows Server 2012, an update to the Start menu known as the "Start screen" was introduced. It covers the entire screen and no longer features the right column. It shows larger tiles for programs and, whenever possible, displays dynamic content supplied by the program directly on the tile itself (known as a "live tile"), behaving similarly to a widget. For instance, the live tile for an email client may display the number of unread emails. The Start screen allows users to uninstall their programs by right-clicking on them and selecting "Uninstall". Pinned apps can be placed in groups. The search box is initially hidden but can be viewed by clicking the search button on the charms bar and can also be brought up as it receives keyboard input. True to its name, the Start screen is the first screen that a user sees upon login.

The idea of a full-screen Start can be traced back to Windows Neptune, when Microsoft originally considered a "Start page" that integrated with Windows desktop through Active Desktop. This menu has its roots in Windows Mobile and Windows Phone: In Windows Mobile Standard, which runs on smartphones, the Start menu produces a separate screen of icons. Windows Phone was the original host of the design principles of the third generation Start menu.

The Start screen no longer supports several previously available features. A list of recently launched programs or shortcuts to special folders no longer appears on the Start screen. It no longer supports more than one level of nesting for groups in the All Programs view. Drag and drop support for adding new items to the menu as well as reorganizing the contents of the All Programs view is no longer available. In addition, for the first time in the history of Windows, the Start menu in a stock installation of Windows 8, Windows Server 2012, Windows 8.1 or Windows Server 2012 R2 does not provide any facility for shutting down, restarting or activating sleep mode or hibernation, forcing users to use the settings button in the charms bar to perform these actions. An April 2014 update for Windows 8.1 and Windows Server 2012 R2 restores the latter.

In Windows RT, a Start menu resembling the Windows 10 start menu replaced the full-screen Start menu in Windows 8.x, in 2015.

=== Windows 10 ===
The Start menu in Windows 10, prior to version 1607

The Start menu in Windows 10, version 20H2 and later

Windows 10 re-introduced the Start menu in a revised form. It uses a two column design similar to Windows 7's version, except that the right side is populated by tiles, similarly to Windows 8's Start screen. Applications can be pinned to the right half, and their respective tiles can be resized and grouped into user-specified categories. The left column displays a vertical list, containing frequently used applications, and links to the "All apps" menu, File Explorer, Settings, and power options. Some of these links, and additional links to folders such as Downloads, Pictures, and Music, can be added through Settings' "Choose which folders appear on Start" page. The Start menu can be resized, or be placed in a full-screen display resembling the Windows 8/8.1 Start screen (although scrolling vertically instead of horizontally). The Start menu also enters this state when "Tablet mode" is enabled.

As of version 1511, the left panel of the Start menu advertises "suggested" Windows Store apps; users can opt out of these suggestions.

Version 1607 and later remove the recent apps view, always showing all apps. Version 20H2 replaced the colorful tiles in previous versions with transparent "theme-aware" tiles in common with the Fluent Design System language.

Windows RT 8.1 update KB3033055 adds a variant of the Windows 10 Start menu that is visually closer to the design used in early preview builds of Windows 10. It allows applications to be pinned to the top of the left column, with recently used apps listed below (much like 7), and as with 10, allows tiles to be pinned to the right column.

=== Windows 11 ===
The Start menu in Windows 11, prior to 25H2

The Start menu in Windows 11, in 25H2, using 'Category' view. This is also available for Windows 11 devices that are also on 24H2.

Windows 11 introduces another major redesign to the Start menu. A search box was reinstated at the top of the menu, and tiles have been replaced by an area for pinned application shortcuts displayed in a grid (similar to many application launchers in Android and iOS), accompanied by a section for "Recommended" applications and files (often equivalent with the user's most recently used files). An "All apps" button is displayed next to the heading for pinned applications. Windows 11 does not support live tiles, with their functionality being moved to the separate "Widgets" area on the taskbar.

In version 25H2 of Windows 11, the Start menu was refined. The 'All' programs menu is no longer on a separate screen but on the main interface, underneath the Pinned and Recommended sections. The layout can be chosen between Category (automatically categorises programs), Grid (icons in alphabetical order) and the previously existing view now called List (long vertical list in alphabetical order). The Pinned section now displays two rows of pinned icons by default.

=== Start button ===
The Start menu may be launched either by pressing ⊞ Win (the Windows key) on a keyboard or its equivalent on a tablet device, pressing Ctrl+Esc on a keyboard, or by clicking on the visual Start button. With the exception of Windows 8 and Windows Server 2012, the Start button can be found on the taskbar. The Start button on Windows Server 2012 and Windows 8 is initially moved from the traditional taskbar to "charms", a hidden secondary taskbar located to the right of the screen (accessed by swiping in from the right on multitouch devices, or positioning the mouse in one of the right corners of the screen and sliding up or down). The Start screen is accessed either by that button or by clicking the lower left corner of the screen. Windows 8.1 and Windows Server 2012 R2 restore the button back to its original place without removing the new button in the charms. On most versions of Windows, the Start button is located on the lower left corner of the screen, while the start button on Windows 11 is located in the center (but can be moved back to the lower left corner).

On a Mac keyboard or on a Mac running Windows through Boot Camp, the ⌘ Command key is used as the Windows logo key to activate the Start menu.

Right-clicking on the Start button invokes a context menu. This menu in Windows 8 and Windows Server 2012 is called the Quick Link menu and grants access to several frequently used features of Windows, such as accessing desktop or File Explorer.

=== Location on disk ===
Users may add Start menu entries by creating folders and shortcuts in the associated "Start Menu" folder, located on the operating system operating media. These appear in a separated section at the top of the Start menu, or, if placed in the Programs sub-folder, in the Programs menu. The location of this folder however, depends on the operating system installed:

- In Windows 9x, this folder is located either in "%windir%\Start Menu" or, if there are multiple users, in "%windir%\Profiles\[username]\Start Menu" path, where [username] is the account name of the user.
- In Windows NT 4.0, the folder is located in "%systemroot%\Profiles\%username%\Start Menu" for individual users, or "%systemroot%\Profiles\All Users\Start Menu" for shared shortcuts. One distinguishing feature in Windows NT 4.0 is that the Start menu separated the per-user shortcuts from the shared shortcuts and by a separator line and used different icons for the program folders in per-user and shared menus.
- In Windows 2000, Windows XP and Windows Server 2003, the folder is located in "%userprofile%\Start Menu" for individual users, or "%allusersprofile%\Start Menu" for shared shortcuts.
- In Windows Vista, Windows Server 2008, Windows 7, Windows Server 2008 R2, Windows Server 2012, Windows 8, Windows 10, and Windows 11, the folder is located in "%appdata%\Microsoft\Windows\Start Menu" for individual users, or "%programdata%\Microsoft\Windows\Start Menu" for the shared portion of the menu.

In Windows Server 2003 and earlier, the folder name "Start Menu" changes depending on the localization; for example, on German versions of Windows XP it is "Startmenü". Windows installers generally use the Windows API to find out the real names and locations of the Start menu and Desktop folders. Since Windows Vista, all folders used by the system use the same name as in the English version and only display different names in Windows Explorer.

=== Tweaks ===
TweakUI, an unsupported utility program from Microsoft, offers additional customizations, including speeding up the response time of the Start menu, window animation, and other hacks. On Windows XP and Windows Vista, it is possible to prevent specific programs from appearing in the recent programs list (the left pane of the Start menu) by modifying the Windows registry.

== Open-source operating systems ==
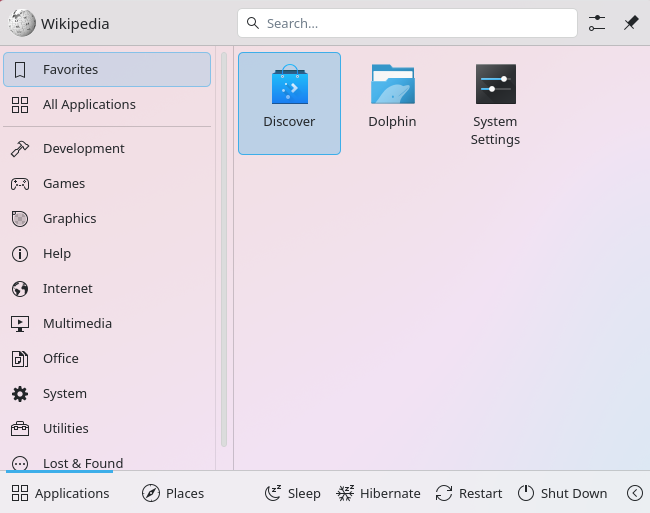
Start menu (known as Application Launcher) in KDE Plasma 6

Many desktop environments for open source operating systems provide an interface element similar to the Start menu:

- Cinnamon
- FVWM95
- GNOME
- IceWM
- KDE Plasma
- Lumina
- LXDE
- MATE
- Qvwm
- ReactOS
- Unity
- Xfce
- RISC OS with Joris Röling's 1989 !Menon

== See also ==
- Desktop environment
- Comparison of Start menu replacements for Windows 8
- Apple menu
