= Distributed file system (disambiguation) =

A distributed file system is a file system where data is distributed across multiple nodes.

Distributed file system may also refer to:

- Shared-disk file system, a different approach, also known as cluster file system
- Distributed File System (Microsoft), the Microsoft distributed file system (DFS)
- Distributed data store
