= Folder redirection =

Windows network storage feature

In computing, and specifically in the context of Microsoft Windows, folder redirection refers to automatically re-routing to or from standard folders to use storage elsewhere on a network.

It is often used in an office network environment to ensure that users do not store data locally when a network device is the preferred storage location. Folder Redirection allows saving data regardless of storage location and separates user data from profile data decreasing the time required to log on.

Other advantages include:

- Data is stored on a server where it can be backed up
- If the same redirection is applied to multiple users, all data is stored in the one location
- Allows for sharing of data between users directly from the server rather than creating shares on individual workstations
- Allows system administrators to spend less on workstation hard drives, and more on file server hard drives
- If all user folders are redirected and caching is disabled, no files are stored on the workstations and thus data is better protected from theft

Under Microsoft Windows, the redirection is often performed by Group Policy, when used in an Active Directory environment. It can also be performed by manually editing the Windows Registry, changing library locations, or with tools such as Tweak UI. Disk quotas can be used to limit the amount of space taken up by users' special folders. The %username% and %userprofile% environment variables can also be used with Folder Redirection.

Up to Windows XP, the Application Data, Desktop, My Documents, My Pictures, and Start Menu special folders can be redirected to a file server. Windows XP also implements a Recycle Bin for the My Documents folder.

Windows Vista introduces the ability to independently redirect up to 10 user profile sub-folders to a network location. There is also a Management Console snap-in in Windows Vista to allow users to configure Folder Redirection for clients running Windows Vista, Windows XP, and Windows 2000. Each redirected folder in Vista and later also has a Recycle Bin associated with it.

Under Windows 7 and later, the following user folders may be redirected: AppData/Roaming, Contacts, Desktop, Downloads, Favorites, Links, Music, Documents, Pictures, Saved Games, Searches, Start Menu, and Videos.

The equivalent functionality is achieved in Unix-like systems by using mount or ln and a NFS or CIF.

== See also ==
- Roaming user profile
- Symbolic link
