= Corel Linux =

- Screenshot of Corel Linux running WordPerfect and Netscape Navigator
- Developer: Corel
- OS family: Unix-like: Linux
- Working state: Discontinued
- Source model: Open-source software
- Initial release: November 15, 1999
- Latest release: Second Edition / August 15, 2000; 25 years ago
- Supported platforms: IA-32
- Kernel type: Monolithic
- Default user interface: CDE (variant of KDE)

Corel Linux, also called Corel LinuxOS, was a Debian-based operating system made by Corel that began beta testing on September 21, 1999 and was released to the public on November 15, 1999. It competed mainly against Microsoft Windows 98 and 2000, and Apple Mac OS 9, and other Linux distributions such as Mandrake Linux and Red Hat Linux. Corel later discontinued the distribution, but did not remove the former Corel Open Source Development website until March 2002.

Corel did not use KFM, the standard KDE file manager. It instead used its own file manager, CFM. This, and other modifications Corel made, made the operating system incompatible with other versions of Linux much more than other competitors in the industry. At a time when there was relatively little commercial Linux software available, this was a serious hurdle for Corel and its users.

The operating system's Second Edition was released on August 15, 2000, in download, regular and deluxe editions. The latter bundled Corel WordPerfect Office for Linux.

Xandros bought the Corel Linux source code and development team when Corel ended its Linux business in August 2001.

== System requirements ==
System requirements
	Minimum	Recommended
Processor	Pentium (P5) or compatible/newer	
Memory	24 MB RAM	64 MB RAM
Video adapter and monitor	VGA (640 x 480) or higher resolution with 2 MB VRAM	
Hard disk drive free space	500 MB for initial release 800 MB for Second Edition	
Optical drive	CD-ROM drive (Note: Any optical drive that can read CD-ROM media.) (only to install from CD-ROM media)	
Input devices	Keyboard, mouse or a compatible pointing device	
Sound	Sound card and speakers or headphones (only for sound playback)	

== Features ==
Corel Linux featured a file manager that was very close in look and feel to Windows Explorer. The file manager provided an integrated Microsoft Windows SMB network browser. The company also advertised that the operating system was compatible with its flagship software.

=== Applications ===
The key selling point of Corel Linux was its compatibility with the company's WordPerfect applications. The eponymous word processor's eighth version was given away to personal customers in hope that they would buy WordPerfect Office 2000. This suite added the Quattro Pro, Corel Presentations and CorelCentral programs. The Deluxe version of that suite added the Paradox database manager and Railroad Tycoon II: Gold. The latter omits a level editor, the network mode and some scenarios from the original game. The 'Limited Edition' of Corel Linux Deluxe came with Civilization: Call to Power instead of Railroad Tycoon II. Unlike the free WordPerfect 8, the office suite was not written natively for Linux, but instead consisted of the Windows programs powered by Corel's fork of the Wine compatibility layer. As a result, the Linux suite suffered from a performance penalty compared to the Windows version of WordPerfect 8.

As with the WordPerfect suite, Corel adapted its graphics applications to run on Linux using Wine. This consisted of the CorelDRAW suite. While the eponymous program was commercial software, Corel Photo-Paint was available as a freeware download.

=== SmartMove ===
Corel SmartMove was a part of Corel Linux. This application provided the following:

1. Migrate Microsoft Windows settings to Corel Linux.
2. Automate restoring settings that are changed by SmartMove.
3. Provide an easy way to access network folders through Corel Linux.

SmartMove was built around the Wine libraries to read the Windows Registry settings for the Windows applications and thus be able to migrate them. SmartMove core libraries created a wrapper for the Windows registry to easily look up the settings.

SmartMove looks for existing Microsoft Windows installations on the machine, looks a little further for individual users, and offers to transfer application settings to analogous programs under Linux. It understands how to deal with Internet Explorer and Netscape cookies and bookmarks, Microsoft Outlook, mIRC, and ICQ settings, and a variety of desktop preferences, including wallpaper, color scheme, and even mouse "handedness". We tried it out with a few settings, but since our Windows installation was fairly new, we didn't have much to check against.

With the end of Corel Linux, this application faded away and is no longer maintained, however similar functions are now available on at least Ubuntu when installing a dual-boot configuration on a machine that already has Windows on it.
