= Mac OS X Public Beta =

First publicly available version of Mac OS

- Version of the macOS operating system
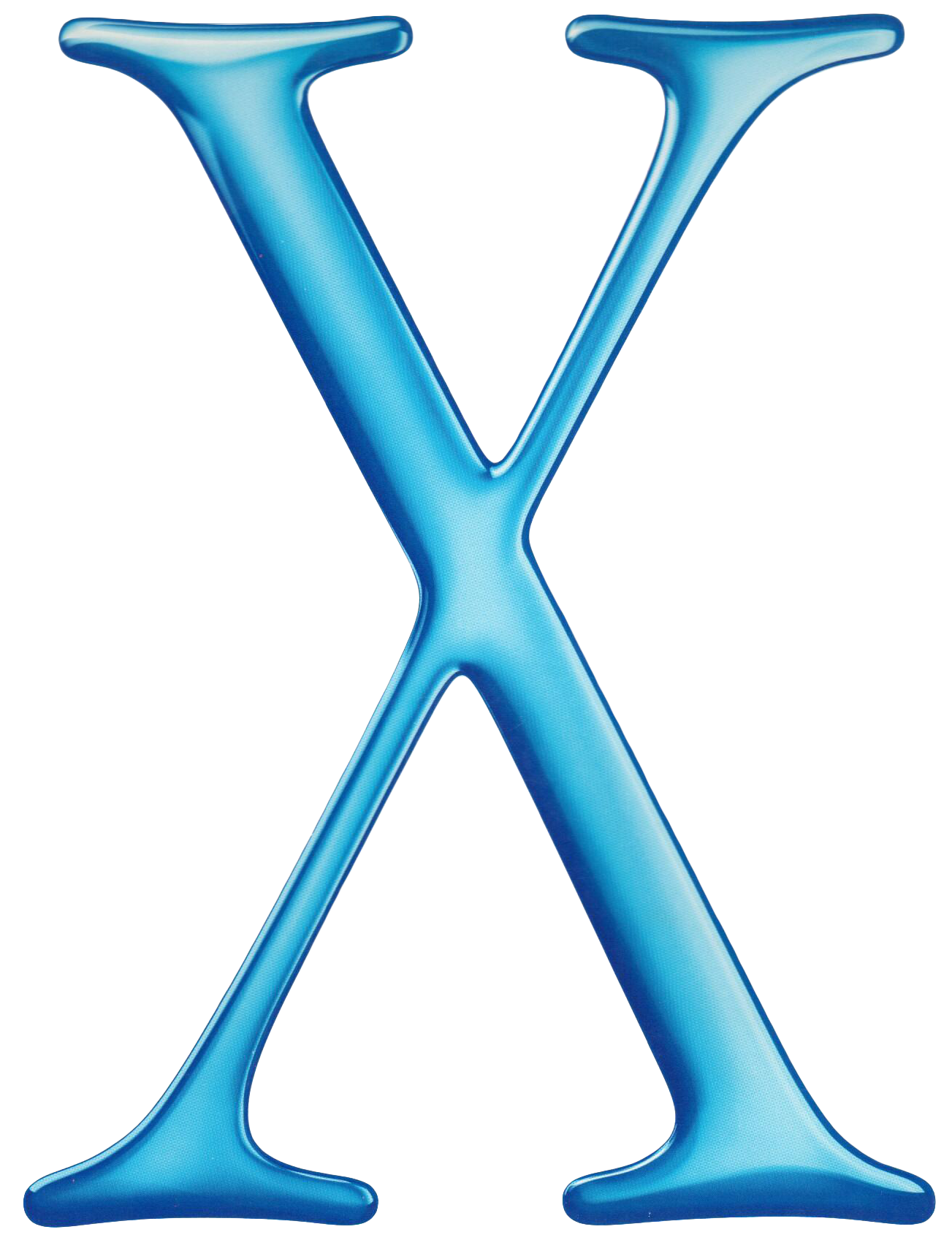

- Developer: Apple Computer
- OS family: Macintosh; Unix-like (Darwin/BSD)
- Working state: Historic, not supported
- Released to manufacturing: September 13, 2000
- Supported platforms: PowerPC
- Kernel type: Hybrid (XNU)
- Default user interface: Aqua
- Preceded by: Mac OS 9 Mac OS X Server 1.0
- Succeeded by: Mac OS X 10.0 Cheetah
- Official website: Apple - Mac OS X at the Wayback Machine (archived November 9, 2000)

Support status
- Historic, unsupported as of March 24, 2001. Expired on May 14, 2001.

Mac OS X Public Beta (code named Kodiak) was the first publicly available version of Apple Computer's Mac OS X (now named macOS) operating system to feature the Aqua user interface. It was released to the public on September 13, 2000, for US$29.95 (equivalent to $56 in 2025). Its release was significant as the first publicly available evidence of Apple's ability to ship the "next-generation Mac operating system" after the Copland failure and the exploratory Rhapsody that was only ever available to developers. It allowed software developers and early adopters to test a preview of the upcoming operating system and develop software for it before its final release. It is the only public version of Mac OS X to have a code name not based on a big cat until the release of 10.9 Mavericks in 2013. The US version had a build number of 1H39 and the international version had build number 2E14.

== Successor OS ==
The Public Beta succeeded Mac OS X Server 1.0, the first public release of Apple's new NeXT OPENSTEP-based operating system, which used a variant of the classic Mac OS's "Platinum" user interface look and feel. The Public Beta introduced the Aqua user interface to the world. Fundamental user interface changes were revealed with respect to fonts, the Dock, the menu bar (with an Apple logo at the center that was later repositioned to the left of the menu bar and made an active interface element). System icons were much larger and more detailed, and new interface eye candy was prevalent.

== Technical changes ==
The beta's arrival marked some fundamental technical changes, most courtesy of an open source Darwin 1.2.1 core, including two features that Mac users and developers had been anticipating for almost a decade: preemptive multitasking and protected memory. To illustrate the benefits of the latter, at the MacWorld Expo in June 2000, Apple CEO Steve Jobs demonstrated Bomb.app, a test application intended to crash.

== Native software ==
The Public Beta included many of the standard programs bundled with macOS for decades to come, such as TextEdit, Preview, Mail, QuickTime Player and Terminal. Also included with the Public Beta, but not in any subsequent versions of Mac OS X, were a simple MP3 player (iTunes had not yet been introduced), Sketch, a basic vector drawing program demonstrating features of Quartz, and HTMLEdit, a WYSIWYG HTML editor inherited from WebObjects.

Native shrinkware applications were few and far between. Early adopters had to turn to open source or shareware alternatives, giving rise to an active homebrew software community around the new operating system. Many programs in use on early Mac OS X systems were inherited from OPENSTEP or Rhapsody developer releases (e.g. OmniWeb or Fire), or were simple wrapper apps that provided a graphical interface to a command-line Unix program.

The poor state of the Carbon API contrasted with the relative maturity of Cocoa gave rise to an anti-Carbon bias among Mac OS X users.

== Expiration ==
The Mac OS X Public Beta expired on May 14, 2001; approximately two months after the release of Mac OS X 10.0, the completed version of the operating system released in March 2001. As a result, it will not run on later PowerPC-based Macintosh computers released after early 2001, nor on later Macintosh hardware that uses a different processor architecture (x86 or ARM64). Using the Mac OS X Public Beta on compatible systems post-expiration date requires setting the hardware clock to a date prior to the expiration.

The expiration date forced users to purchase a copy of the final release rather than continuing to use the Public Beta, as well as reassured industry observers skeptical after the Copland and Rhapsody failures that Apple would actually release a next-generation operating system this time. Owners of the Public Beta version were entitled to a $30 discount on the price of the first full version of Mac OS X 10.0. Only the Aqua GUI and related components of the Public Beta were subject to expiry; the underlying Darwin command-line based OS continued to function.
