= Mac OS X 10.0 =

2001 operating system version

- Version of the macOS operating system
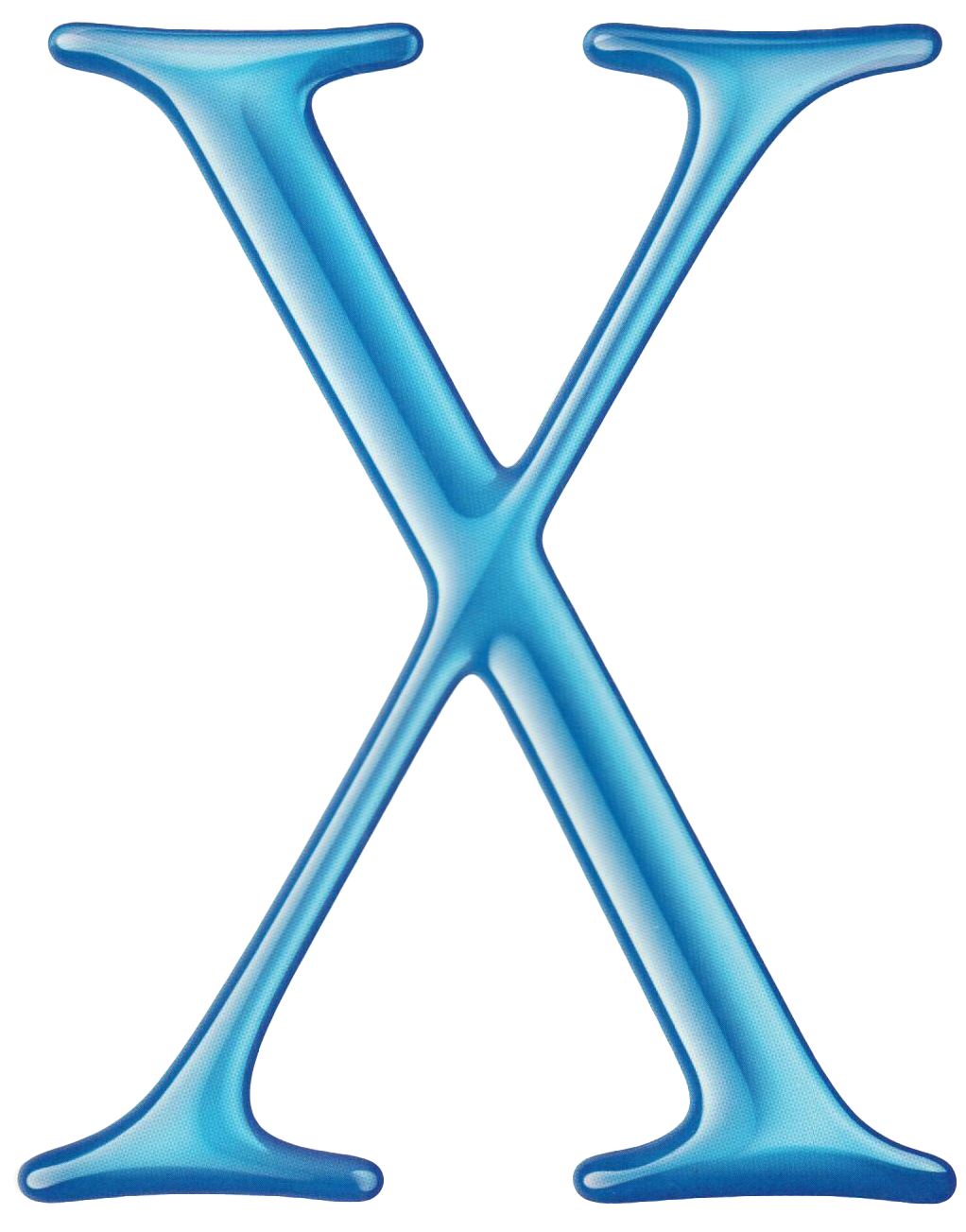

- Screenshot of Mac OS X 10.0
- Developer: Apple Computer
- OS family: Macintosh; Unix-like
- Working state: No longer supported
- Source model: Closed, with open source components
- General availability: March 24, 2001; 25 years ago
- Latest release: 10.0.4 / June 22, 2001; 25 years ago
- Supported platforms: PowerPC
- Kernel type: Hybrid (XNU)
- Default user interface: Aqua
- License: Apple Public Source License (APSL) and Apple end-user license agreement (EULA)
- Preceded by: Mac OS 9; Mac OS X Public Beta
- Succeeded by: Mac OS X 10.1
- Official website: Mac OS X 10.0 (archived at Wayback Machine)
- Tagline: The future is here. The power of UNIX with the simplicity and elegance of Macintosh.

Support status
- Historical, unsupported as of November 13, 2006

Mac OS X 10.0, codenamed "Cheetah", is the first major release of Apple's Mac OS X (now macOS) operating system. Released on March 24, 2001, it served as a successor to Mac OS 9 and the classic Mac OS as a whole.

Mac OS X introduced major changes to the Mac OS architecture and user interface; it adopted a new Unix-like architecture derived from elements of BSD and NeXTSTEP, which are intended to improve the operating system's stability and multitasking capabilities in comparison to the classic Mac OS. It incorporates a new graphical user interface known as "Aqua", which features increased use of transparency and animation effects, and a new application launcher known as the Dock. Mac OS X uses two main frameworks for applications, including Carbon, an updated version of the original Mac OS APIs, and Cocoa, an object-oriented infrastructure based on that of NeXTSTEP.

== Development ==
=== NeXT acquisition, Rhapsody ===
After the collapse of several other attempts to build a modernized replacement for the aging classic Mac OS (including the ill-fated Copland project), Apple Computer CEO Gil Amelio elected to pursue acquiring another operating system vendor to leverage their existing technology instead. The search was narrowed down to two companies both founded by Apple alumni: Jean-Louis Gassée's Be Inc., and Steve Jobs' NeXT. On December 20, 1996, Apple announced that it would acquire NeXT for $400 million; as part of the acquisition, Apple planned to use the NeXTSTEP operating system and its Mach kernel as the basis for a future release of Mac OS, and announced that Steve Jobs would return to the company in a consulting role.

At its Worldwide Developers Conference (WWDC) in May 1997, Apple first demonstrated the Rhapsody project—which combined the NeXTSTEP architecture with adaptations of key Mac OS technologies such as AppleScript, Apple events, and QuickTime, and a user interface incorporating elements of Mac OS (including Mac OS 8's new "Platinum" theme); the company promoted that the new platform would be more stable and reliable than the existing Mac OS, while Jobs stated that the object-oriented OpenStep APIs (which would be referred to as the "Yellow Box") would make it faster and easier for developers to write software, and provide opportunities for cross-platform applications that could be ported to Windows (as well as the possibility of the OS also being available for Intel compatible systems). Apple planned to support the classic Mac OS for a period of time in parallel with Rhapsody, while also providing a compatibility environment known as the "Blue Box" to run most existing software via an emulated Mac OS.

Rhapsody was met with hesitation from third-party developers such as Adobe, who did not want to rewrite their existing Macintosh applications for the Yellow Box platform, showed a lack of confidence in Apple due to the mismanagement of the Copland project, and feared a second-system effect due to Rhapsody co-existing with the classic Mac OS. In October 1997, Jobs stated that the transition to Rhapsody would be more gradual than originally indicated by Amelio (who had been ousted in favor of Jobs as "interim CEO" of Apple); Rhapsody would be repositioned as a server-oriented product akin to Windows NT, and a new consumer-oriented operating system would be released some time afterward.

=== Retool as Mac OS X ===
At WWDC 1998, it was announced that this new platform would be known as "Mac OS X" (pronounced "Mac OS 10"), and would be released in late-1999, following Rhapsody and Mac OS 8.5 in 1998. Jobs revealed that Mac OS X would feature a new API—later named "Carbon"—which would adapt the existing Mac OS APIs to run atop the new NeXTSTEP-based platform. Carbon would allow existing Mac OS software to be ported natively to Mac OS X with only "minor adjustments" to their code. It was also announced that Adobe, Macromedia, and Microsoft had committed to supporting their software on Mac OS X.

Mac OS X Server 1.0 would be released in 1999 as a stopgap product based on Rhapsody. In March 1999, it was announced that core components of Mac OS X (particularly lower-level and open source components such as the Mach-based kernel and BSD-based interfaces, but not higher-level components such as the application libraries and user interface) would be released as a free and open-source project known as "Darwin".

Developer previews of Mac OS X were released later in the year; while still having some elements of Rhapsody such as the "Platinum" user interface, they began to incorporate interoperability improvements such as Carbon, an updated version of the Yellow Box APIs known as Cocoa, support for being installed on HFS+ volumes (as opposed to Rhapsody and NeXTSTEP's use of UFS), and an updated version of the Blue Box known as the "Classic Environment" (which, unlike the Blue Box, would allow Mac OS X and OS 9 applications to co-exist in the same desktop environment, and not operate as a standalone, full-screen application). Apple had projected Mac OS X to be released in 2000.

At Macworld in January 2000, Jobs unveiled "Aqua"—a new graphical user interface of Mac OS X built upon the new Quartz graphics framework. Aqua was intended to be visually appealing for new users, while also providing a more powerful interface for advanced users. During the keynote, Jobs announced that Mac OS X would be "on sale as a software product starting this summer". Mac OS X Developer Preview 3 (DP3) was released in February 2000, as the first build released to developers that included the Aqua interface. This was followed by DP4 in May 2000 during WWDC.

During the conference, the promised summer release was revealed to actually be a public beta build, rather than the final release as was originally implied; the Mac OS X Public Beta was released on September 13, 2000, and sold for US$29.95.

=== Release ===
The final release—branded as Mac OS X 10.0—was officially released on March 24, 2001, with an MSRP of US$129 (equivalent to $235 in 2025); a $30 rebate was also made available to users that had purchased the Public Beta.

Launch events were hosted over the weekend by Apple's retail outlets and local Macintosh User Groups (MUGs), including midnight releases, live demonstrations of the operating system, and promotional giveaways. One launch event held by Elite Computers & Software—an Apple reseller located across the street from its headquarters in Cupertino, California—was promoted as "California's largest Mac OS X launch party", and was attended by Apple co-founder Steve Wozniak. A separate server release known as Mac OS X Server 10.0 was released the following May.

== New and updated features ==
=== Infrastructure ===
Mac OS X marks a formal transition from the classic Mac OS to Darwin, a multi-user, Unix-like operating system derived from NeXTSTEP and BSD. Darwin incorporates the XNU kernel derived from Mach and BSD; it replaces the Mac OS nanokernel used in the classic Mac OS, and offers protected memory and preemptive multitasking. Software for Mac OS X can be written using several architectures; the two main APIs are "Cocoa"—an object-oriented interface descended from the NeXTSTEP and OpenStep specifications, and "Carbon"—a descendant of the APIs from the classic Mac OS. Cocoa and Carbon, in turn, run atop a base API known as the Core Foundation. Applications are packaged as bundles (.app files) containing their code, resources, and metadata (the last of which serving as a replacement for resource forks on the classic Mac OS), and can encapsulate binaries for multiple Mac OS versions and CPU architectures.

Quartz serves as the graphics architecture for Mac OS X: it consists of an underlying windowing server known as Core Graphics Services, and the high-level Core Graphics Rendering—a PDF-based 2D graphics engine that renders bitmaps and vectors in various contexts. It serves as a replacement for NeXTSTEP's Display PostScript engine, and takes input from an API, PDF files, as well as OpenGL, QuickDraw, and QuickTime. As it handles PDF rendering at a system level, Core Graphics Rendering is also used as part of the printing system.

The "Classic Environment" allows Mac OS 9 to be booted in a sandbox environment to run legacy software not compatible with Mac OS X. Classic requires a Mac OS 9.1 system folder to be present on the system; retail copies of Mac OS X 10.0 included a copy of Mac OS 9.1 for use with the feature.

=== User interface ===
Mac OS X introduced a revamped user interface known as Aqua. Replacing the "Platinum" theme used since Mac OS 8, Aqua features glossy widgets with a liquid-like look and the use of pinstripes as a visual motif (echoing Apple's hardware of the era), transparency effects, and extensive use of animations; for example, modal dialog boxes (such as file dialogs) can animate out from the title bar of a window on a "sheet" attached to that window. Title bars use a new "traffic light" layout for their window controls, with a red button closing the window, a yellow button minimizing it, and a green button to make the window larger.

The desktop features a new application launcher known as the Dock, on which users can store shortcuts to preferred applications and folder locations. The Dock serves as a taskbar, displaying running applications, and individual windows are able to be minimized to a section of the Dock. The Trash was also moved from the desktop to the Dock. The Apple menu now primarily serves as a system menu rather than an application launcher, containing links to preferences, recent documents, and system power controls.

The control panels folder of the classic Mac OS was replaced by a new unified application known as System Preferences. The Finder was redesigned with a revamped, "browser"-styled view, with a customizable toolbar (including a back button and links to common folders) and a new column-based display mode.

As part of Aqua, Apple also introduced a new style guide for icons used by the operating system and applications, encouraging "emotive", realistic designs: application icons are meant to use "familiar objects" and appear to be stacked on a desk at an angle, while utilities are meant to have a reduced amount of color and appear to be sitting on a desk to emphasize their "serious" nature.

=== Removed features ===
- The system can only use TCP/IP, not AppleTalk, to connect to servers sharing the Apple Filing Protocol. It cannot use SMB to connect to Windows or Samba servers.
- As a server, the system can share files using only the Apple Filing Protocol (over TCP/IP), HTTP, SSH, and FTP.
- Neither DVD playback nor burning CDs or DVDs is supported. However, audio CD burning was added in the Mac OS X 10.0.2 update, roughly two months after initial release.

== Language support ==
Mac OS X 10.0 began a short era (that ended with Mac OS X 10.2 Jaguar's release) where Apple offered two types of installation CDs: 1Z and 2Z CDs. The difference in the two lay in the extent of multilingual support.

Input method editors of Simplified Chinese, Traditional Chinese, and Korean were only included with the 2Z CDs. They also came with more languages (the full set of 15 languages), whereas the 1Z CDs came only with about eight languages and could not actually display simplified Chinese, traditional Chinese and/or Korean (except for the Chinese characters present in Japanese Kanji). A variant of 2Z CDs were introduced when Mac OS X v10.0.3 was released to the Asian market (this variant could not be upgraded to version 10.0.4). The brief period of multilingual confusion ended with the release of v10.2. As of 2026, all of Mac OS X/macOS installation media and preinstallations include the full set of available languages and full multilingual compatibility.

== Reception ==
Mac OS X 10.0 received mixed reviews, with the new Aqua interface receiving a positive reception, but criticism centered primarily around its performance, hardware support, and missing features in comparison to Mac OS 9.

Macworld found that the new user interface would be more difficult to learn for long-time Macintosh users than novices, but praised new aspects such as the Dock and updated Finder. Mac OS X was considered to be more reliable than the classic Mac OS due to its memory protection and preemptive multitasking, but that it was still "rather sluggish in places", and that not all hardware vendors (particularly printer manufacturers) had released updated drivers for Mac OS X yet. It was noted that Apple planned to release patches via Software Update to address some of its early issues (such as the lack of CD burning support, which was noted as being an "embarrassing" exclusion given Apple's then-present "Rip. Mix. Burn." advertising campaign for its new iMac models and iTunes), but suggested that most users should wait for Mac OS X 10.1 later in the year.

John Siracusa of Ars Technica felt that Cheetah "shows tremendous promise, which is a nice way of saying that the 10.0 release is not quite ready for prime time", noting that it had issues with stability, the user interface having both performance and usability regressions in comparison to Mac OS 9, a lack of driver support at launch for devices such as printers, and missing features at launch such as CD burning and DVD playback support. Classic was praised for having achieved an "impressive" level of co-existence between OS 9 and Mac OS X applications, but was prone to stability and rendering issues. It was noted that despite being "slightly slower on the redraw in almost every respect" than native Mac OS 9.1 on the same hardware, Classic applications were more visually responsive than those of Mac OS X itself. Among the bundled applications, it was argued that Cocoa applications (including Mail and the third-party web browser OmniWeb) were generally more performant and had better integration with OS features than Carbon-based applications (such as the Finder, as well as the Internet Explorer for Mac 5.1 preview—which performed worse than the Mac OS 9 version via Classic).

Apple reported that 100,000 copies of the Mac OS X 10.0 public beta were sold, and more than 75,000 feedback entries were submitted. No official adoption numbers were stated by Apple until 8 months after the release of Mac OS X 10.1, where they stated that they had shipped over 3 million Macs with Mac OS X preinstalled. Following the release of 10.0, the Mac OS X development team reserved six months to focus primarily on performance improvements, which were incorporated into 10.1

== Release history ==
Version	Build	Date	Darwin version	Notes
10.0	4K78	March 24, 2001	1.3	Original retail CD-ROM release
10.0.1	4L13	April 14, 2001	1.3.1	Apple: Mac OS X 10.0: Software Update 1.3.1, 10.0.1 Update, and Epson Printer Driver Update Provide Feature Enhancement, Address Issues
10.0.2	4P12	May 1, 2001	1.3.1	
10.0.3	4P13	May 9, 2001	1.3.1	Update and Before You Install Information
10.0.4	4Q12	June 21, 2001	1.3.1	Apple: 10.0.4 Update and Before You Install Information
10.0.4	4R14	July 18, 2001	1.3.1	For Quicksilver Power Mac G4
10.0.4	4S10	August 20, 2001	1.3.1	For Quicksilver Power Mac G4 (Dual 800 MHz)

== System requirements ==
- Supported Computers: Power Macintosh G3 Beige, G3 B&W, G4, G4 Cube, iMac G3, PowerBook G3, PowerBook G4, iBook
- RAM:
  - 128 MB (unofficially 64 MB minimum)
- Hard Drive Space:
  - 1,500 MB (800 MB for the minimal install)

== Timeline ==
Timeline of Mac operating systems

Preceded by Mac OS 9	Mac OS X 10.0 (Cheetah); 2001	Succeeded by Mac OS X 10.1 (Puma)
