= EGWord =

Japanese word processor

- Developer(s): Monokakido
- Initial release: 1985
- Stable release: 2.2.32 / March 25, 2025
- Operating system: macOS
- Platform: x64 AArch64
- Type: Word Processor
- Website: https://www.monokakido.jp/ja/mac/egworduniversal2/

EGWord is a Japanese word processor program for Macintosh. It was known for handling Japanese text before System 1.x was officially translated into Japanese. As of 2023, it is developed and sold by Monokakido, and is also compatible with macOS Sequoia.

Due to the closing of developer Ergosoft's packaged software business on January 28, 2008, development and sales of the program ended with "egword Universal 2'' being the final version. On September 4, 2017, Monokakido announced the acquisition of the development assets of egword Universal, and in March 2018, a version compatible with macOS High Sierra was released on the Mac App Store.

== History ==
Development began at the same time as Ergosoft was founded in January 1984, and its origins lie in "Lingo," a Japanese word processing program for the Apple Lisa that was exhibited as a prototype at the Business Show in May of the same year. Apple Computer Japan assisted in the development. "EGWord" Ver. 1.0 was announced at the Data Show in September 1984, and shipments of EGWord Ver. 2.1 to Apple Computer Japan began in September 1985. Two years after its first release, EgWord was still "the only Japanese-language word processor for the Macintosh".
