= Briefcase (Microsoft Windows) =

Special folder in Microsoft Windows

In Microsoft Windows, the Briefcase is a special folder that supports a simple two-way file synchronization between itself and another folder. The Briefcase is designed for mobile PC users so that they may transfer it to a removable drive and have it synchronize with the computer to which the removable drive is attached. It follows the same metaphor as the file and file folder and then, while the file management tasks are performed by Windows Explorer, the briefcase behaves just like another folder, i.e. with support for copy-paste and drag-and-drop. It has additional functions and toolbar buttons for updating out-of-sync files. The Windows Briefcase was introduced in Windows 95, deprecated (although not removed) in Windows 8 and completely disabled (but still present and accessible via modification of the Windows Registry) in Windows 10 until it was finally removed in Windows 10 build 14942.

== Overview ==
The Windows Briefcase synchronizes files and folders within itself with those in any other folder, even on a removable writable media or the network. It is intended for users with portable media or multiple computers. To use the Briefcase, users only need to use Windows Explorer and then drag or copy their files into the Briefcase once. Any further changes to either the files on disk or those in the Briefcase are synchronized whenever the user right-clicks on the briefcase and selects Update All.

If there are differences between the copies, the Briefcase shows a dialog box with an icon and a description indicating the action it will take when synchronizing; that is, whether it will replace the copy in the Briefcase with the external file or vice versa, or leave both versions unchanged. The action the Briefcase will take is configurable by right clicking the icon. For example, users can skip synchronizing individual items by selecting the Skip action upon right clicking the icon. For items deleted in either the Briefcase or the main original folder, the Briefcase can create a copy of the missing item. Users can also sync individual items in the Briefcase by selecting the item first and then clicking the Update button instead of Update All.

The update status of each item is stored in the Briefcase. If any item does not link to any original item outside the briefcase, (for example when the drive containing the briefcase is inserted in a secondary computer, or the original has been deleted in the main computer) it is called an orphan.

== Internals ==
Most special folders in Windows (such as Briefcase folders) have a hidden file (with "system" attribute) called Desktop.ini. They may also have Windows Registry entries describing them. The Desktop.ini for a Briefcase contains the following lines:

[.ShellClassInfo]
CLSID={85BBD920-42A0-1069-A2E4-08002B30309D}
ConfirmFileOp=0
RunWizard=0
[Briefcase]
Database=Briefcase Database

- The CLSID setting specifies the class identifier of the "Briefcase" class, which is required for a folder to appear as a Briefcase.
- The ConfirmFileOp setting appears to have no effect.
- The RunWizard setting specifies whether to display the "Welcome to the Windows Briefcase" dialog when the user opens the Briefcase. This setting is removed once the dialog is displayed for the first time.

A second file called "Briefcase Database", bearing "hidden" and "system" attributes, and no filename extension, serves as the Briefcase index. Its fourCC is "DDSH".

The Briefcase folder itself must have "read-only" or "system" file attributes (default is read-only) in order to display as a Briefcase. The Desktop.ini and Briefcase Database files are not required to have the hidden or system attributes in order for the parent folder to display as a Briefcase.

== Briefcase Reconciler ==
When Microsoft Access is installed, the Windows Briefcase gets special functionality due to installed Microsoft Office files. It can be used as a replication tool for Access databases that use the Jet database engine by dragging the .MDB file to the Briefcase so that the database is automatically converted into replicable form. The Design Master can be left at the source and replica put into the Briefcase or vice versa. When synchronizing, the replicas are merged by the Briefcase reconciler.

The Windows Shell also allowed developers to create their own document briefcase reconcilers to combine different input versions of a document to produce a single, new output version of the document.

== See also ==
- Comparison of file synchronization software
- OneDrive § Client apps
