= Windows shell =

Graphical user interface for Microsoft Windows

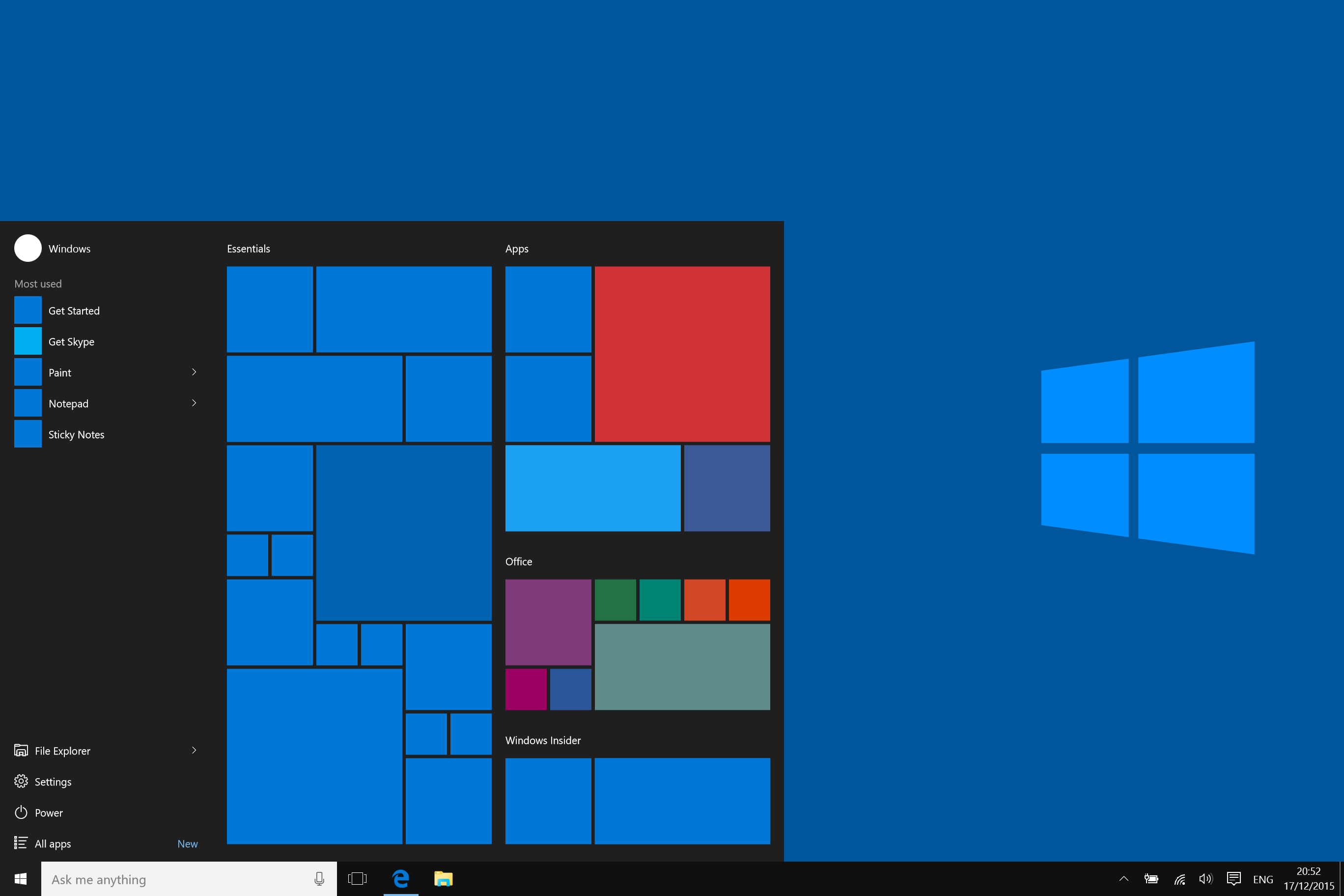
- Abstract version of the Windows shell
- Developer: Microsoft
- Operating system: Microsoft Windows
- Type: Graphical user interface, Desktop environment
- License: Proprietary commercial software
- Website: learn.microsoft.com/en-us/windows/win32/shell/shell-entry

The Windows shell is the graphical user interface for the Microsoft Windows operating system. Its readily identifiable elements consist of the desktop, the taskbar, the Start menu, the task switcher and the AutoPlay feature. On some versions of Windows, it also includes Flip 3D and the charms. In Windows 10, the Windows Shell Experience Host interface drives visuals like the Start Menu, Action Center, Taskbar, and Task View/Timeline. However, the Windows shell also implements a shell namespace that enables computer programs running on Windows to access the computer's resources via the hierarchy of shell objects. "Desktop" is the top object of the hierarchy; below it there are a number of files and folders stored on the disk, as well as a number of special folders whose contents are either virtual or dynamically created. Recycle Bin, Libraries, Control Panel, This PC and Network are examples of such shell objects.

The Windows shell, as it is known today, is an evolution of what began with Windows 95, released in 1995. It is intimately identified with File Explorer, a Windows component that can browse the whole shell namespace.

== Features ==
=== Desktop ===
Windows Desktop is a full-screen window rendered behind all other windows. It hosts the user's wallpaper and an array of computer icons representing:

- Files and folders: Users and software may store computer files and folders on Windows desktop. Naturally, on a newly installed version of Windows, such items do not exist. Software installers commonly place files known as shortcuts on the desktop, allowing users to launch installed software. Users may store personal documents on the desktop.
- Special folders: Apart from ordinary files and folders, special folders (also known as "shell folders") may appear on the desktop. Unlike ordinary folders, special folders do not point to an absolute location on a hard disk drive. Rather, they may open a folder whose location differs from computer to computer (e.g. Documents), a virtual folder whose contents is an aggregate of several folders on disk (e.g. Recycle Bin or Libraries) or a folder window whose content is not files, but rather user interface elements rendered as icons for convenience (e.g. Network). They may even open windows that do not resemble a folder at all (e.g. Control Panel).

Windows Vista and Windows 7 (and the corresponding versions of Windows Server) allowed Windows Desktop Gadgets to appear on the desktop.

=== Taskbar ===
Windows taskbar is a toolbar-like element that, by default, appears as a horizontal bar at the bottom of the desktop. It may be relocated to the top, left or right edges of the screen. Starting with Windows 98, its size can be changed. The taskbar can be configured to stay on top of all applications or to collapse and hide when it is not used. Depending on the version of operating system installed, the following elements may appear on the taskbar respectively from left to right:

- Start button: Provides access to the Start menu. Removed in Windows 8 (but can be added using third-party software), in favor of the Start charm (see below), only to be reinstated in Windows 8.1. Pictured as a Windows logo.
- Quick Links menu: Added in Windows 8 and Windows Server 2012. Invoked by right-clicking on the Start button, or pressing ⊞ Win+X. Grants access to several frequently used features of Windows, such as accessing the desktop, Settings, Windows Command Processor, PowerShell, and File Explorer.
- List of open windows: Along the length of the taskbar, open windows are represented by their corresponding program icons. And once pinned, they will remain even after their respective windows are closed. Until Windows 7, the operating system displayed active windows as depressed buttons in this list. Starting with Windows 7, the icon for each open window is framed by a translucent box, and multiple open windows for the same program can be accessed by clicking the program's icon. When the open window icon is hovered over with the mouse, a preview of the open window is shown above the icon. However, the taskbar can be changed to function more as it does with older versions of Windows. Starting from Windows 7, the open windows icons can be configured to show the program icon only, referred to as "combining taskbar buttons", or give the program name alongside the program icon.
- Shortcuts: An update to Windows 95 and Windows NT 4 added a Quick Launch Bar that can hold file, program, and action shortcuts, including by default the "show desktop" command. Windows 7 merged this area into the list of open windows by adding "pinning" and "jump list" features.
- Deskbands: Toolbars provided by Windows or other programs for easier access to that program's functions; for more information, see Taskbar § Desktop toolbars
- Notification area: Allows programs to display icons representing their status as well as pop-up notifications associated with those icons. By default, Windows volume control, network status, Action Center, date and time are displayed in this area. Windows 11 combines the notification center and clock/calendar into one menu.
- "Show desktop" button: Allows users to access their desktops. It is moved from the left of the Taskbar as a Quick Launch shortcut to the rightmost side as its own dedicated hover button in Windows 7. Not initially visible in Windows 8. Once the mouse cursor is hovered upon for a second, makes all windows transparent as long as the pointer stays over the button, thus showing the desktop without switching to it: this feature requiring Aero. Clicking the button dismisses all open windows and transfers the focus to the desktop. Clicking it again before selecting any other window reverts the action. This feature also available on Windows 8, 8.1, 10, and 11.
- Task View: A function in Windows 10 and 11 allowing the user to view and manage open windows and virtual desktops. The 1803 version includes the Timeline, adding the ability to view and open previously used apps over a certain period of time. Task View can be accessed by pressing the Task View button on the taskbar, or by pressing ⊞ Win+Tab ↹ on the keyboard. Timeline was removed in Windows 11.
- Cortana and Search: User can utilize Microsoft's Cortana Virtual Assistant, which enables internet searches, searches for apps and features on the PC, and searches for files and documents. Cortana can be accessed by clicking the search bar, pressing the microphone button, saying "Hey Cortana", or by pressing ⊞ Win+C on the keyboard. Searches can be initiated by also pressing the search bar, or by pressing ⊞ Win+Q on the keyboard.
- Action Center: Introduced in Windows 7, the Action Center gave notifications and tips on boosting computer performance and security. In Windows 10, the Action Center serves as a place for all notifications to reside, as well as the location of frequently used settings, such as screen brightness, wireless connectivity, VPNs, Bluetooth, projector connections, and wireless display connections. Replacing the Charms from Windows 8, the Windows 10 Action Center can be accessed by pressing the speech bubble icon on the taskbar, pressing ⊞ Win+A on the keyboard, or, if using a touchscreen, swiping from the right. In Windows 11, the Action Center was removed in favor of the Quick Settings menu and the notification center. ⊞ Win+A now opens Quick Settings, while ⊞ Win+N opens the notification center.
- Widgets: Windows 11 introduced a "Widgets" feature which replaces the functionality of live tiles seen in the Windows 8 and 10 Start Menus. By signing in with a Microsoft Account, the user can personalize the information they wish to see in the Widgets panel, including weather, news, sports, calendar events, etc. Widgets are not a replacement for Desktop Gadgets found in Windows Vista and Windows 7.
- Quick Settings: A taskbar menu introduced in Windows 11 that unifies the functionality of Windows 10's Action Center and system tray icons. Network settings, battery, and sound settings can be accessed by clicking on the Quick Settings menu, as well as accessibility options, Bluetooth toggle, screen brightness, Focus Assist, and other features. Media playback controls are now housed in the Quick Settings menu instead of a hovering menu like in Windows 10.

=== Task switching ===
Task switcher is a feature present in Windows 3.0 and all subsequent versions of Windows. It allows a user to cycle through existing application windows by holding down the Alt key and tapping the Tab ↹ key. Starting with Windows 95, as long as the Alt key is pressed, a list of active windows is displayed, allowing the user to cycle through the list by tapping the Tab ↹ key. An alternative to this form of switching is using the mouse to click on a visible portion of an inactive window. However, Alt+Tab ↹ may be used to switch out of a full screen window. This is particularly useful in video games that lock, restrict or alter mouse interactions for the purpose of the game. Starting with Windows Vista, Windows Desktop is included in the list and can be activated this way.

Windows 7 introduced Aero Flip (renamed Windows Flip in Windows 8). When the user holds down the Alt key, Aero Flip causes only the contents of the selected window to be displayed. The remaining windows are replaced with transparent glass-like sheets that give an impression where the inactive window is located.

Windows 8 introduced Metro-style apps, which did not appear when Alt+Tab ↹ was pressed. (They have to be switched with their own dedicated task switcher, activated through the ⊞ Win+Tab ↹ combination.) Windows 8.1 extended Alt+Tab ↹ to manage the Metro-style apps as well.

Windows 10 and 11 have a unified task switcher called Task View, which manages not only application windows but virtual desktops as well.

=== Aero Flip 3D ===
Flip 3D is a supplemental task switcher. It was introduced with Windows Vista and removed in Windows 8. It is invoked by holding down the ⊞ Win key and tapping the Tab ↹ key. As long as the ⊞ Win key remains pressed, Windows displays all application windows, including the Desktop, in an isometric view, diagonally across the screen from the top left corner to the bottom right corner. The active window at the time of pressing the ⊞ Win key is placed in front of the others. This view is maintained while ⊞ Win key is held down. Tab ↹ and ⇧ Shift+Tab ↹ cycle through the open windows, so that the user can preview them. When the ⊞ Win key is released, the Flip 3D view is dismissed and the selected window comes to the front and into focus.

=== Charms ===
The charms in Windows 8

Windows 8 added a bar containing a set of five shortcuts known as the "charms", invoked by moving the mouse cursor into the top or bottom right-hand corners of the screen, or by swiping from the right edge of a compatible touchpad or touch screen. This feature was retained in 8.1.

Windows 10 removed the charms and moved the commands associated with them into the system menu of each application. For users with touch screens, swiping from the right of the touch screen now shows Action Center.

=== Start menu ===
Starting with Windows 95, all versions of Windows feature a form of Start menu, usually by this very same name. Depending on the version of Windows, the menu features the following:

- Launching applications: The menu's primary function is to present a list of shortcuts for installed software, allowing users to launch them. Windows 8 and 10 utilize tiles in the start menu, allowing the user to display icons of different sizes, and arrange icons as the user chooses. Microsoft Store Metro-style apps can utilize live tiles, which are used to add visual effects and provide, for example, notifications for a specific app, such as Email notifications for Windows Mail.
- Invoking special folders: Until Windows 8, the Start menu was a mean of invoking special folders such as Computer, Network, Control Panel, etc. In Windows 8 and Windows Server 2012, the only special folder that can be invoked from the Start screen is the desktop. Windows 10 restored this functionality.
- Searching: Starting with Windows Vista, searching for installed software, files and folders became a function of the Start menu. Windows 10 ended this tradition by moving the search into taskbar.
- Managing power states: Logging off and shutdown has always been a function of the Start menu. In Windows 8, the shutdown function was moved out of the Start screen, only to be brought back in Windows 8.1 Update (in April 2014) with a sufficiently high screen resolution. Computer power states can also be managed by pressing Alt+F4 while focused on desktop, or by pressing Ctrl+Alt+Del.

=== AutoPlay ===
AutoPlay is a feature introduced in Windows XP that examines newly inserted removable media for content and displays a dialog containing options related to the type and content of that media. The possible choices are provided by installed software: it is thus not to be confused with the related AutoRun feature, configured by a file on the media itself, although AutoRun is selectable as an AutoPlay option when both are enabled.

== Relation with File Explorer ==
File Explorer is a Windows component that can browse the shell namespace. In other words, it can browse disks, files and folders as a file manager would, but can also access Control Panel, dial-up network objects, and other elements introduced above. In addition, the explorer.exe executable, which is responsible for launching File Explorer, is also responsible for launching the taskbar, the Start menu and part of the desktop. However, the task switcher, the charms, or AutoPlay operate even when all instances of the explorer.exe process are closed, and other computer programs can still access the shell namespace without it. Initially called Windows Explorer, its name was changed to File Explorer beginning with Windows 8, although the program name remains explorer.exe.

== History ==
=== MS-DOS Executive ===
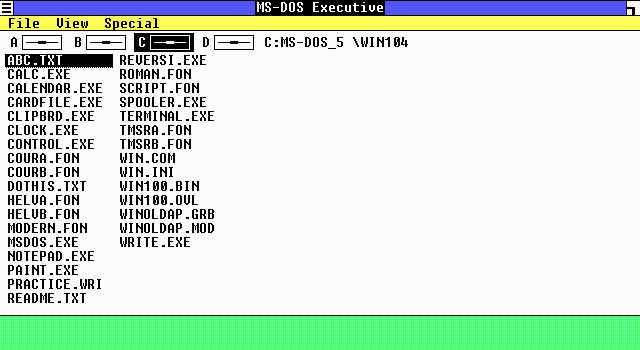
MS-DOS Executive file manager

The first public demonstration of Windows, in 1983, had a simplistic shell called the Session Control Layer, which served as a constantly visible menu at the bottom of the screen. Clicking on Run would display a list of programs that one could launch, and clicking on Session Control would display a list of programs already running so one could switch between them.

Windows 1.0, shipped in November 1985, introduced MS-DOS Executive, a simple file manager that differentiated between files and folders by bold type. It lacked support for icons, although this made the program somewhat faster than the file manager that came with Windows 3.0. Programs could be launched by double-clicking on them. Files could be filtered for executable type, or by a user-selected wildcard, and the display mode could be toggled between full and compact descriptions. The file date column was not Y2K compliant.

Windows 2.0 made no significant change to MS-DOS Executive.

=== Program Manager ===
Windows 3.0, introduced in May 1990, shipped with a new shell called Program Manager. Based on Microsoft's work with OS/2 Desktop Manager, Program Manager sorted program shortcuts into groups. Unlike Desktop Manager, these groups were housed in a single window, in order to show off Microsoft's new Multiple Document Interface.

Program Manager in Windows 3.1 introduced wrappable icon titles, along with the new Startup group, which Program Manager would check on launch and start any programs contained within. Program Manager was also ported to Windows NT 3.1, and was retained through Windows NT 3.51.

=== Start menu ===
Windows 95 introduced a new shell. The desktop became an interactive area that could contain files (including file shortcuts), folders, and special folders such as My Computer, Network Neighborhood and Recycle Bin. Windows Explorer, which replaced File Manager, opened both ordinary and special folders. The taskbar was introduced, which maintained buttons representing open windows, a digital clock, a notifications area for background processes and their notifications, and the Start button, which invoked the Start menu. The Start menu contains links to settings, recently used files and, like its predecessor Program Manager, shortcuts and program groups.

Program Manager is also included in Windows 95 for backward compatibility, in case the user disliked the new interface. This is included with all versions of Windows up to and including Windows XP Service Pack 1. In SP2 and SP3, PROGMAN.EXE is just an icon library, and it was completely removed from Windows Vista in 2006.

The new shell was also ported to Windows NT, initially released as the NewShell update for Windows NT 3.51 and then fully integrated into Windows NT 4.0.

=== Windows Desktop Update ===
In early 1996, Netscape announced that the next release of its browser, codenamed "Constellation", would completely integrate with Windows and add a new shell, codenamed "HomePort", which would present the same files and shortcuts no matter which machine a user logged into. Microsoft started working on a similar Internet Explorer release, codenamed "Nashville". Internet Explorer 4.0 was redesigned and resulted in two products: the standalone Internet Explorer 4 and Windows Desktop Update, which updated the shell with features such as Active Desktop, Active Channels, Web folders, desktop toolbars such as the Quick Launch bars, ability to minimize windows by clicking their button on the taskbar, HTML-based folder customization, single click launching, image thumbnails, folder infotips, web view in folders, Back and Forward navigation buttons, larger toolbar buttons with text labels, favorites, file attributes in Details view, and an address bar in Windows Explorer, among other features. It also introduced the My Documents shell folder.

Future Windows releases, like Windows 95C (OSR 2.5) and Windows 98, included Internet Explorer 4 and the features of the Windows Desktop Update already built in. Improvements were made in Windows 2000 and Windows ME, such as personalized menus, ability to drag and sort menu items, sort by name function in menus, cascading Start menu special folders, customizable toolbars for Explorer, auto-complete in Windows Explorer address bar and Run box, displaying comments in file shortcuts as tooltips, advanced file type association features, extensible columns in Details view (IColumnProvider interface), icon overlays, places bar in common dialogs, high-color notification area icons and a search pane in Explorer.

=== Start menu and taskbar changes ===
Windows XP introduced a new Start Menu, with shortcuts to shell locations on the right and a list of most frequently used applications on the left. It also grouped taskbar buttons from the same program if the taskbar got too crowded, and hid notification icons if they had not been used for a while. For the first time, Windows XP hid most of the shell folders from the desktop by default, leaving only the Recycle Bin (although the user could get them back if they desired). Windows XP also introduced numerous other shell enhancements.

In the early days of the Longhorn project, an experimental sidebar, with plugins similar to taskbar plugins and a notifications history was built into the shell. However, when Longhorn was reset the integrated sidebar was discarded in favor of a separate executable file, sidebar.exe, which provided Web-enabled gadgets, thus replacing Active Desktop.

Windows Vista introduced a searchable Start menu and live taskbar previews to the Windows shell. It also introduced a redesigned Alt+Tab ↹ switcher which included live previews, and Flip 3D, an application switcher that would rotate through application windows in a fashion similar to a Rolodex when the user pressed the ⊞ Win+Tab ↹ key combination. Windows 7 added 'pinned' shortcuts and 'jump lists' to the taskbar, and automatically grouped program windows into one icon (although this could be disabled).

Windows Server 2008 introduced the possibility to have a Windows installation without the shell, which results in fewer processes loaded and running.

Windows 8 removed Flip 3D in order to repurpose ⊞ Win+Tab ↹ for displaying an application switcher sidebar containing live previews of active Windows Store apps for users without touchscreens.

Windows 10 added the possibility to have more than one virtual desktop, known as Task View, to group active program windows to their own virtual desktop. It is possible to navigate through these desktops using Ctrl+⊞ Win+→ and Ctrl+⊞ Win+←, or by clicking on the Task View icon in the taskbar. Pressing Ctrl+⊞ Win+D creates a new virtual desktop. ⊞ Win+Tab ↹ was repurposed to invoke an overview of all active windows and virtual desktops. Windows 10 also added Cortana to the Start menu, to provide interaction with the shell through vocal commands. Newer versions of Windows 10 include recent Microsoft Edge tabs in the Alt+Tab ↹ menu, which can be disabled to only show open programs, as is the behavior in prior versions of the operating system.

== Shell replacements ==
Windows supports the ability to replace the Windows shell with another program. A number of third party shells exist that can be used in place of the standard Windows shell.

== See also ==
- DOS Shell
- Command Prompt
