= Apple menu =

System menu on Mac operating systems

The Apple Menu in macOS Ventura

The Apple menu is a drop-down menu that is on the left side of the menu bar in the classic Mac OS, macOS and A/UX operating systems. The Apple menu's role has changed throughout the history of Apple Inc.'s operating systems, but the menu has always featured a version of the Apple logo.

== System 6 and earlier ==
The Apple Menu in System 6.0.8 with MultiFinder enabled, showing the installed Desk Accessories

In System 6.0.8 and earlier, the Apple menu featured a Control Panel, as well as Desk Accessories such as a Calculator, the Scrapbook and Alarm Clock. If MultiFinder (an early implementation of computer multitasking) was active, the Apple menu also allowed the user to switch between multiple running applications. The Macintosh user could add third-party Desk Accessories via the System Utility "Font/DA Mover". However, there was a limitation on the number of Desk Accessories that could be displayed in the Apple menu. Third-party shareware packages such as OtherMenu added a second customizable menu (without the trademarked Apple logo) that allowed users to install Desk Accessories beyond Apple's limitations.

== System 7.0–9.2.2 ==
The Apple Menu in Mac OS 8.6

System 7.0 introduced the Apple Menu Items folder in the System Folder. This allowed users to place alias(es) to their favorite software and documents in the menu. The Menu Manager forced these additions into alphabetical order, which prompted users to rename their aliases with leading spaces, numbers and other characters in order to get them into the order that suited them the best. Several third-party utilities provided a level of customization of the order of the items added to the Apple menu without having to rename each item.

The Apple menu also featured a Shut Down command, implemented by a Desk Accessory. An alias to the Control Panels folder was also present. System 7.0 was also the first version to feature the rainbow striped logo, as opposed to the black logo found in previous versions. In System 7.0, the black logo was retained in grayscale modes, and was used when the Monitors control panel was set to display "Thousands" or "Millions" of grays, though the rest of the display was in color.

System 7.0 featured built-in multitasking, so MultiFinder was removed as an option. The feature allowing users to switch between multiple running applications as in System 6 was given its own menu (appearing as the icon of the active application) on the opposite side of the menubar. Beginning in Mac OS 8.5, this new menu was given a unique "tear-off" capability, which detached the menu from the menu bar to become a free-floating window when the user dragged the cursor downwards off the bottom of the menu. In this case, it ran the application called "Application Switcher".

System 7.5 added an Apple Menu Options control panel, which added submenus to folders and disks in the Apple Menu, showing the contents of the folder or disk. Prior versions of System 7 showed only a standard menu entry that opened the folder in Finder. Apple Menu Options also added Recent Applications, Recent Documents, and Recent Servers to the Apple Menu; the user could specify the desired number of Recent Items.

== macOS ==
macOS (previously known as Mac OS X and OS X) features a completely redesigned Apple menu. System management functions from the Special menu have been merged into it. The Apple menu was missing entirely from the Mac OS X Public Beta, replaced by a nonfunctional Apple logo in the center of the menu bar, but the menu was restored in Mac OS X 10.0. The quick file access feature implemented in System 7 was removed, although a third-party utility, Unsanity's FruitMenu, restored the Apple menu to its classic functionality until it stopped working with the advent of OS 10.6 (Snow Leopard).

The Apple menu is now dedicated to managing features of the Macintosh computer, with commands to get system information, update software, launch the Mac App Store, open System Preferences, set Dock preferences, set the location (network configuration), view recent items (applications, documents and servers), Force Quit applications, power management (sleep, restart, shut down), log out, etc.

== See also ==
- Start menu
