= My Documents =

Special folder in Microsoft Windows

My Documents is the commonly recognized name of a special folder in Microsoft Windows (even though starting with Windows Vista, it is called Documents only, and the actual name of the folder might be different when the language of the installed copy of Windows is not English). This folder is supposed to be a personal area where users store their personal non-shared documents. However, many software developers have ignored this convention and as a result, this folder has become a dumping ground for the application data such as files containing settings and saved games. Users cannot delete, move or organize these files without causing unwanted behavior in their software.

Up to Windows XP, it contained other subfolders such as "My Pictures", "My Music" and "My Videos". Starting with Windows Vista, these subfolders were moved out of My Documents and were made its siblings.

== Overview ==
Microsoft first introduced the "My Documents" folder in Windows 95 OEM Service Release 2, as a standard location for storing user-created files. The folder is located under the root directory of the boot volume. A shortcut to it is displayed directly on the user's desktop.

The Windows NT family of operating systems set up the "My Documents" folder in the user's profile folder. In Windows XP and earlier, the path is \Documents and Settings\[user name]\My Documents\ (alias %USERPROFILE%\My Documents\) on boot volume. A user can later change the physical location of "My Documents". However, "My Documents" in Windows Explorer (and file dialog boxes) doesn't appear as an absolute path. In addition to translation, the display name of the folder might change depending on owner of the folder. For example, if a user who has logged on to Windows XP and later with user account A look at the personal folders of user account B via Windows Explorer, instead of "My Documents", he sees "B's Documents". This customization is achieved using desktop.ini file.

Windows Vista makes a lot of changes to this folder. Dropping "My" in its name, it is stored in \Users\[user name]\Documents regardless of the Windows language. Windows Explorer, however, shows a different display name for it, depending on the chosen language. For instance, an English copy of Windows shows "My Documents", a French copy shows "Mes documents" and a German copy shows "Eigene Dokumente" (changed from "Eigene Dateien" in Windows XP). Additionally, "My Pictures", "My Music" and "My Videos" are not longer stored in it; they are now called "Pictures", "Music" and "Video" and are now its siblings.

== Perversion of purpose ==
This folder is supposed to be a personal area where users store their personal non-shared documents. Users are supposed to be sole authority of what is stored in this folder. Creating, renaming, moving, or deleting the contents of this folder is not supposed to impact the proper execution of installed software. However, many software developers have ignored this convention and as a result, this folder has become a dumping ground for the application data such as files containing settings and saved games. For example:

- Remote Desktop Connection creates a hidden Default.rdp file.
- Windows PowerShell creates a WindowsPowerShell subfolder.
- Microsoft Office creates a Custom Office Templates subfolder.
- Fiddler creates a Fiddler2 subfolder.
- Calibre creates a Calibre library subfolder.
- AutoCAD 2016 creates two subfolders: AutoCAD Sheet Sets and Inventor Server SDK ACAD 2016.
- SoftMaker creates a SoftMaker subfolder which contains mainly templates next to some other files.
- FS-UAE creates an FS-UAE subfolder which contains all kinds of configurations and other adjustments.

Users cannot delete, move or organize these files without causing unwanted behavior in their software.

== Other "My" folders ==
Windows 98 introduced two additional folders with a "My" prefix: "My Music" and "My Pictures". They are not present in Windows Server 2003 by default, unless enabled using the Start menu customization. Installing Windows Media Player 10 or 11 on Windows XP adds a "My Videos" folder which Windows Media Player uses to store video files that are shown in its media library. In Windows Vista, "My" prefix is removed and these three folders are expelled out of what is now called "Documents". In addition, other user folders are added: "Contacts", "Downloads", "Favorites", "Links", "Saved Games" and "Searches". Windows 10 adds "OneDrive".

== Group Policy ==
On Windows machines which operate as part of a Windows Server domain, administrators can configure the location of "My Documents" (and other Special Folders) through Group Policy. Corporate desktop deployments commonly redirect "My Documents" to a folder on a file server.

== See also ==
- My Briefcase
- Home directory
- Windows Shell namespace
