= Shutdown (computing) =

Remove power from a computer's main components in a controlled way

Windows XP shutdown dialog box

Windows 11 power menu, opened from the Start menu

To shut down, shut off or power off a computer is to remove power from a computer's main components in a controlled way. After a computer is shut down, main components such as CPUs, RAM modules and hard disk drives are powered down, although some internal components, such as an internal clock, may retain power.

== Implementations ==
The shutdown feature and command is available in Microsoft Windows, ReactOS, HP MPE/iX, and in a number of Unix and Unix-like operating systems such as Apple macOS.

=== Microsoft Windows and ReactOS ===
Shutdown options have been moved from a separate dialog box to the start menu, in Windows Vista and later versions of Microsoft Windows. The above is from Windows 7.

In Microsoft Windows and ReactOS, a PC or server is shut down by selecting the Shutdown item from the Start menu on the desktop. Options include shutting down the system and powering off, automatically restarting the system after shutting down, or putting the system into stand-by mode.

Just like other operating systems, Windows has the option to prohibit selected users from shutting down a computer. On a home PC, every user may have the shutdown option, but in computers on large networks (such as Active Directory), an administrator can revoke the access rights of selected users to shut down a Windows computer.

In Windows, a program can shut down the system by calling the ExitWindowsEx or NtShutdownSystem function.

==== Command-line interface ====
shutdown
- The shutdown command on Windows 10
- Developers: Microsoft, ReactOS Contributors
- Operating system: Windows, ReactOS
- Type: Command
- License: Windows: Proprietary commercial software ReactOS: GNU General Public License
- Website: docs.microsoft.com/en-us/windows-server/administration/windows-commands/shutdown

There is also a shutdown command that can be executed within a command shell window. shutdown.exe is the command-line shutdown application (located in %windir%\System32\shutdown.exe) that can shut down the user's computer or another computer on the user's network. Different parameters allow different functions. More than one parameter can be used at a time for this command.

Parameter	Function
-l	Logs off a user. This is the default even without using any parameters.
-a	Stops shutdown.exe. It is used during a time-out period.
-f	Kills all running applications.
-s	Turns off the computer.
-r	Shuts down and reboots a computer.
-m[\\ Computer Name]	When shutting down a network computer, allows user to choose which computer to turn off.
-t xx	Timer before shut down occurs. By default it is set to 30 seconds.
-c "message"	Allows a message to be shown in the System Shutdown window. It can not be more than 127 characters.

=== Apple macOS ===
macOS power management dialog box

In Apple macOS the computer can be shut down by choosing "Shut Down…" from the Apple Menu, by pressing Control+Power key/button (or Media Eject key), or by pressing the power key to bring up the power management dialog box and selecting button "Shut down". An administrator may also use the Unix shutdown command as well. It can also be shut down by pressing Control+⌥ Option+⌘ Command+Power key/button (or Media Eject key) or clicking Shut Down on the Apple Menu while holding the ⌥ Option key, but this will not prompt the user anything at all. On newer and some older Apple computers, starting with Mac OS 9, the user is given a time limit in which the computer will automatically shut down if the user does not click the "Shut Down" button.

=== Unix and Linux ===
shutdown
- Original author: Scott James Remnant
- Developer: Canonical
- Operating system: Unix-like
- Type: Command

In Unix and Linux, the shutdown command can be used to turn off or reboot a computer. Only the superuser or a user with special privileges can shut the system down.

One commonly issued form of this command is shutdown -h now, which will shut down a system immediately. Another one is shutdown -r now to reboot. Another form allows the user to specify an exact time or a delay before shutdown: shutdown -h 20:00 will turn the computer off at 8:00 PM, and shutdown -r +1 will automatically reboot the machine in one minute of issuing the command.

== See also ==
- Booting
- Hibernation
- Sleep mode
- Ctrl+Alt+Del
