= Qvwm =

1996 window manager software

QVWM
- Developers: Kenichi Kourai, Ivan Kormanov
- Stable release: 1.1.12-10 / 13 March 2011
- Written in: C++
- Operating system: Unix-like
- Type: Window manager
- License: GPL-2.0-or-later
- Website: ahinea.com/projects/qvwm

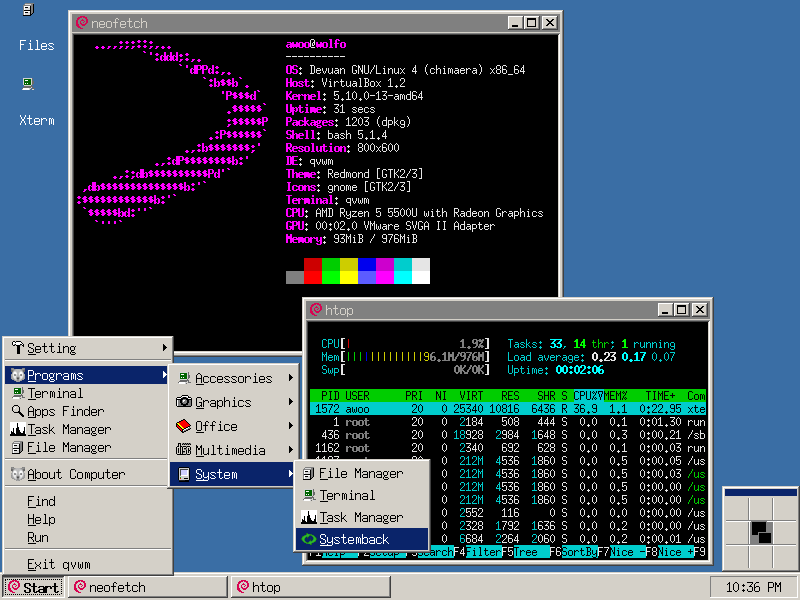
QVWM's applications menu being fully expand. Two xterm (a terminal program) run neofetch and htop, respectively.

Qvwm is a window manager, intended as a reimplementation of the Windows 95 interface for Linux systems. Released in 1996 under the GNU General Public License. The project's name comes from wordplay references to Japanese words and Roman numbers. In 2000, Linux Format called Qvwm "an unusually impressive imposter".

Unlike Windows 95's registry, Qvwm uses a textual configuration file. Qvwm includes virtual desktops, a feature lacking in Windows 95. One reviewer criticized this practice as "against qvwm's stated purpose." Apart from standard X libraries, the only software library it depends on is X PixMap (libxpm). The developers had intended to develop a full class library called libqv but this never occurred.

The original author of Qvwm, Kenichi Kourai, no longer maintains it, but in 2006 the project was picked up by Ivan Kurmanov, who applied patches made by the Debian project and added features of his own.

Qvwm was included in Debian since 1999 but was removed in early 2009 because of the lack of updates as well as using deprecated libraries.

In 2020, the source code of Qvwm is available on GitHub (under the user Asveikau) so this window manager can be compile-install to Linux (BSDs, Minix, etc.) through "configure, make, install" method (or any method similar or better than this).

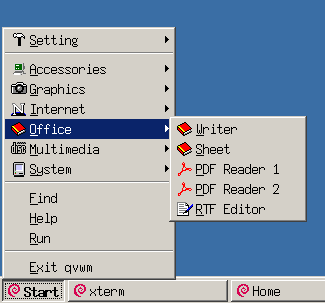
Applications menu type 1.

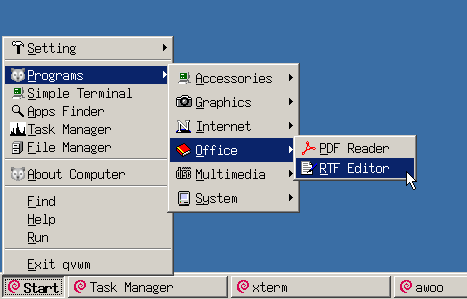
Applications menu type 2.
