= Network browser =

Type of software application

A network browser is a tool used to browse a computer network. An example of this is My Network Places (or Network Neighborhood in earlier versions of Microsoft Windows). An actual program called Network Browser is offered in Mac OS 9.

== See also ==
- Browser service
