= My Network Places =

My Network Places (formerly Network Neighborhood) is the network browser feature in Windows Explorer. It was first introduced in Windows 95 and Windows NT 4.0 as Network Neighborhood, and was renamed My Network Places in Windows 2000 and later. It was replaced entirely in Windows Vista with a "Network" node in Explorer.

== Functionality ==
My Network Places maintains an automatically updated history of computers which the user has accessed before, by default placed in a folder called NetHood, found in the user's user profile. The feature also allows enumerating all computers on the local network that support the Server Message Block (SMB) protocol and are open to discovery. The default location can be changed by modifying the pair of NetHood registry entries found under the registry keys HKEY_CURRENT_USER\Software\Microsoft\Windows\CurrentVersion\Explorer\Shell Folders and HKEY_CURRENT_USER\Software\Microsoft\Windows\CurrentVersion\Explorer\User Shell Folders.

In a workgroup of up to 32 computers running Windows NT 4.0, Windows 2000, or Windows XP (or up to 16 computers running Windows 95, Windows 98, or Windows Me), the list of network destinations in My Network Places is generated by one of the computers on the network, which has been designated the master browser (sometimes called browser master). The master browser is elected by several criteria, including the version of Windows installed on the computer, how long the computer has been available on the network, and the hostname of the computer, among others. Sometimes when similar systems are connected to a network, there might be a conflict between master browser with unexpected consequences, such as the disappearance of the list altogether or some system becoming unreachable. A system can be forced to decline master browser status by disabling the Browser service and rebooting. In a workgroup of between 33 and 64 computers running NT 4.0, 2000, or XP (or between 17 and 32 computers running 95, 98, or Me), the master browser assigns two computers as backup master browsers. For each additional respective group of 32 or 16 computers, an additional backup master browser is assigned.

Starting with Windows Vista, My Network Places is removed in favor of an integrated "Network" node in Windows Explorer. This node can only enumerate network computers but can do so via WS-Discovery and UPnP protocols, in addition to SMB.

== Security flaw ==
In Windows XP, navigating to My Network Places can unknowingly transmit the user's local login password to other computers on the workgroup. This occurs as the Windows XP computer automatically attempts to discover and compile the list of all the shared resources available on the network. If the password for a specific resource has not been previously saved, the operating system defaults to using the current user's local login password to attempt authentication. A serious security flaw arises when an NT 4.0 computer is present on the same workgroup. In this instance, Windows XP transmits the password to the NT 4.0 computer using the outdated LAN Manager (LN) authentication protocol. As LM authentication lacks the cryptographic strength of newer Windows NT authentication methods, it is susceptible to credential theft by attackers eavesdropping on network traffic.

== See also ==
- Special folder
