= Tweak UI =

Microsoft utility for customizing Windows

- Tweak UI running on Windows XP
- Original author: Raymond Chen
- Developer: Microsoft
- Release: 1996; 30 years ago
- Stable release: 2.10
- Operating system: Microsoft Windows

Tweak UI is a free application, released in 1996 by Microsoft for customizing the Microsoft Windows operating system's user interface. Tweak UI modifies the Windows Registry in the same way as a user could edit it manually with a program such as Registry Editor, but provides a simple graphical user interface that does not need knowledge of the registry structure, is quicker and easier to use, and not susceptible to registry damage due to user error.

Tweak UI was formerly downloadable free of charge from Microsoft's website. It is one of Microsoft's many non-supported PowerToys.

== History ==
Tweak UI started as a control panel applet available for download on Microsoft's website, released shortly after the release of Windows 95. It was originally written by Raymond Chen and later included in Microsoft's PowerToys collection, a set of tools developed by Microsoft's Shell Development Team.

An updated version of Tweak UI was included on the installation disc for Windows 98. According to Chen, this was deemed a "disaster" because it resulted in additional work for Microsoft's product-support teams when diagnosing problems.

With the release of Windows XP, the Tweak UI applet was retooled and re-released on Microsoft's website as a separate executable, TweakUI.exe. It was again updated to version 2.10 for Windows XP Service Pack 1 and Windows Server 2003. Chen also wrote an updated Windows Vista version of the utility, but it was not released as it violated the policy of not making available unsupported software.

An unofficial 64-bit version of Tweak UI was created by NeoSmart Technologies for Windows XP Professional x64 Edition.
