= List of Microsoft codenames =

Microsoft codenames are given by Microsoft to products it has in development before these products are given the names by which they appear on store shelves. Many of these products (new versions of Windows in particular) are of major significance to the IT community, and so the terms are often widely used in discussions before the official release. Microsoft usually does not announce a final name until shortly before the product is publicly available. It is not uncommon for Microsoft to reuse codenames a few years after a previous usage has been abandoned.

There has been some suggestion that Microsoft may move towards defining the real name of their upcoming products earlier in the product development lifecycle to avoid needing product codenames.

== Operating systems ==
=== Windows 3.x and 9x ===
Codename	Preliminary name	Final name	Notes	Ref
Janus	—N/a	Windows & MS-DOS 5	Combined bundle of Windows 3.1 and MS-DOS 5. Janus is a Roman god usually depicted with two faces, here symbolizing the previously separate Windows and MS-DOS products.	
Jastro	—N/a	Windows & MS-DOS 6	Combined bundle of Windows 3.1 and MS-DOS 6. Portmanteau of Janus and Astro, the codename of MS-DOS 6.	
Sparta, Winball	Windows 3.1 Plus	Windows for Workgroups 3.1	Windows 3.1 (16-bit) with enhanced networking; designed to work particularly well as a client with the new Windows NT.	
Snowball	—N/a	Windows for Workgroups 3.11	An updated version of Windows for Workgroups 3.1, which introduces 32-bit file access and network improvements. It also removes the Standard Mode, effectively dropping support for 16-bit x86 processors.	
Chicago	Windows 4.0, Windows 93, Windows 94	Windows 95	For codenames of some of the internal components of Windows 95, see "Jaguar", "Cougar", "Panther" and "Stimpy" under § OS components	
Detroit	—N/a	USB Supplement to Windows 95 OSR2	Named after Detroit, Michigan. A writer for Maximum PC suggested that "Detroit" and other Windows 95-era names were answers to the question posed by Microsoft's "Where do you want to go today?" marketing campaign.	
Nashville	Windows 96	Dropped	Named after Nashville. Cancelled upgrade for Windows 95; sometimes referred to in the press as Windows 96. Codename was reused for Internet Explorer 4.0 and Windows Desktop Update which incorporated many of the technologies planned for Nashville.	
Memphis	Windows 97	Windows 98	—N/a	
Millennium	—N/a	Windows Me	ME stands for Millennium Edition; Microsoft states that it is pronounced Me.	

=== Windows NT family ===
Codename	Preliminary name	Final name	Notes	Ref
Razzle	NT OS/2, Advanced Windows	Windows NT 3.1	Is also the name of a script that sets up the Windows NT development environment. NT OS/2 reflected the first purpose of Windows NT to serve as the next version of OS/2, before Microsoft and IBM split up. Microsoft used the NT OS/2 code to release Windows NT 3.1.	
Daytona	—N/a	Windows NT 3.5	Named after the Daytona International Speedway in Daytona Beach, Florida.	
Cairo	—N/a	Dropped	A cancelled project that would have fulfilled Bill Gates' "Information at your fingertips" vision	
Shell Update Release	—N/a	Windows NT 4.0	—N/a	
Wolfpack	—N/a	Microsoft Cluster Server	—N/a	
Janus	—N/a	Dropped	Codename for the proposed 64-bit edition of Windows 2000, which was never released.	
Impala	—N/a	Windows NT 4.0 Embedded	—N/a	
Neptune	—N/a	Dropped	Planned to be the first consumer-oriented release of Windows NT succeeding the Windows 9x series; merged with Odyssey to form Whistler.	
Triton	—N/a	Dropped	A cancelled successor to "Neptune".	
Asteroid	—N/a	Windows 2000 Service Pack 1	—N/a	
Odyssey	—N/a	Dropped	Planned to be a successor to Windows 2000; merged with Neptune to form Whistler.	
Whistler	Windows 2002	Windows XP	Named after Whistler Blackcomb, where design retreats were held.	
Mantis	—N/a	Windows XP Embedded	Named after the Mantis shrimp.	
Freestyle	—N/a	Windows XP Media Center Edition	—N/a	
Harmony	—N/a	Windows XP Media Center Edition 2004	—N/a	
Symphony	—N/a	Windows XP Media Center Edition 2005	—N/a	
Slalom	—N/a	Dropped	Longhorn Media Center Edition. Scrapped in favor of including Windows Media Center in Home Premium and Ultimate editions instead of a dedicated Media Center edition.	
Emerald	—N/a	Windows XP Media Center Edition 2005 Update Rollup 2	—N/a	
Diamond	—N/a	Windows Media Center	Included with Windows Vista.	
Springboard	—N/a	—N/a	Set of enhanced security features, included in Windows XP Service Pack 2.	
Lonestar	—N/a	Windows XP Tablet PC Edition 2005	—N/a	
Whistler Server	Windows 2002 Server, Windows .NET Server, Windows .NET Server 2003	Windows Server 2003	—N/a	
Bobcat	—N/a	Windows Small Business Server 2003	Not to be confused with Microsoft Bob.	
Eiger, Mönch	—N/a	Windows Fundamentals for Legacy PCs	Mönch included additional features for use on mobile devices.	
Longhorn	—N/a	Windows Vista	Named after the Longhorn Bar in the Whistler Blackcomb ski resort; initially planned as a "minor release" between "Whistler" and "Blackcomb" (see below)	
Blackcomb, Vienna	—N/a	Dropped	The purported successor to Whistler, and later, Longhorn. Named after Whistler Blackcomb, where design retreats were held. Blackcomb was later renamed to Vienna in January 2006, named after the capital of Austria. Eventually cancelled due to scope creep and replaced with Windows 7.	
Q, Quattro	—N/a	Windows Home Server	—N/a	
Vail	—N/a	Windows Home Server 2011	—N/a	
Longhorn Server	—N/a	Windows Server 2008	—N/a	
Cougar	—N/a	Windows Small Business Server 2008	—N/a	
Centro	—N/a	Windows Essential Business Server	Named after the Spanish translation of the word "center".	
7	—N/a	Windows 7	The number 7 comes from incrementing the internal version number of Windows Vista (6.0) by one. Often incorrectly referred to as Blackcomb or Vienna, while the codenames actually refer to an earlier Vista successor project that was cancelled due to scope creep.	
Windows Server 7	—N/a	Windows Server 2008 R2	—N/a	
Solution Server	—N/a	Windows MultiPoint Server 2010	—N/a	
Windows MultiPoint Server "2"	—N/a	Windows MultiPoint Server 2011	—N/a	
Fiji	Windows Vista Media Center Feature Pack 2008	Windows Media Center TV Pack 2008	Named after the country of Fiji.	
Cascades	Windows Essential Business Server "v2"	Windows Essential Business Server 2008 R2 (cancelled)	Originally intended as the successor of Windows Essential Business Server 2008 but was cancelled "due to external factors".	
Aurora	—N/a	Windows Small Business Server 2011 Essentials	—N/a	
Quebec	—N/a	Windows Embedded Standard 7	Named after the province of Quebec	
Windows 8	—N/a	Windows 8	Often incorrectly referred to as Jupiter, Midori and Chidori. Jupiter is the application framework used to create "immersive" apps for Windows 8, and Midori was a separate, managed code operating system. (see below)	
Windows Server "8"	—N/a	Windows Server 2012	—N/a	
Blue	—N/a	Windows 8.1	—N/a	
Windows Server Blue	—N/a	Windows Server 2012 R2	—N/a	
Threshold	Windows 8.2, Windows 9	Windows 10; Windows 10 November Update	Named after a location seen in Halo: Combat Evolved, near which Installation 04 orbits.	
Redstone	—N/a	Windows Server 2016; Windows 10 Creators Update; Windows 10 Fall Creators Update; Windows 10 April 2018 Update; Windows Server 2019	Named after a fictional mineral from Minecraft.	
Santorini	Windows 10X	Dropped	Named after an island in Greece. Originally supposed to be a new OS to be released mid-late 2021, was eventually cancelled. Some of its features were integrated into Windows 11 and other products.	
Sun Valley	—N/a	Windows 11	Named after Sun Valley, Idaho.	
Hudson Valley	—N/a	Windows 11, version 24H2	Named after Hudson Valley, New York.	

=== Windows platform development semesters ===
The following are code names used for internal development cycle iterations of the Windows core, although they are not necessarily the code names of any of the resulting releases. With some exceptions, the semester designations usually matches the Windows version number.

Codename	Semester	Release	Notes	Ref
Titanium	19H1	Windows 10 May 2019 Update	Named after the chemical element in the periodic table.	
Vanadium	19H2	Windows 10 November 2019 Update	Named after the chemical element in the periodic table.	
Vibranium	20H1	Windows 10 May 2020 Update; Windows 10 October 2020 Update; Windows 10 May 2021 Update; Windows 10 November 2021 Update; Windows 10 2022 Update	Named after the fictional metal Vibranium in Marvel Comics as continuing the previous line of chemical elements with Chromium could have caused confusion with the web browser project.	
Manganese	20H2	—N/a (Note: Builds of these semesters were only released via the Windows Insider program.)	Named after the chemical element in the periodic table.	
Iron	21H1	Windows Server 2022 (Note: Windows Server 2022 reports as version 21H2, although it is in fact based on the earlier Iron codebase.)	Named after the chemical element in the periodic table.	
Cobalt	21H2	Windows 11	Named after the chemical element in the periodic table.	
Nickel	22H2	Windows 11 2022 Update; Windows 11 2023 Update	Named after the chemical element in the periodic table. Originally planned to be the 22H1 semester, although that semester was ultimately skipped and Nickel shifted to 22H2, expanded to span the entire year.	
Copper	23H1	—N/a	Named after the chemical element in the periodic table.	
Zinc	23H2	Windows Server, version 23H2	Named after the chemical element in the periodic table.	
Gallium	24H1	—N/a	Named after the chemical element in the periodic table.	
Germanium	24H2	Windows 11 2024 Update; Windows Server 2025; Windows 11 2025 Update; Windows 11 2026 Update	Named after the chemical element in the periodic table.	
Dilithium	25H1	—N/a	Named after the fictional material from Star Trek.	
Selenium	25H2	—N/a	Named after the chemical element in the periodic table.	
Bromine	26H1	Windows 11, version 26H1	Named after the chemical element in the periodic table.	
Krypton	26H2	—N/a	Named after the chemical element in the periodic table.	
Rubidium	27H1	—N/a	Named after the chemical element in the periodic table.	

=== Windows CE family ===
Codename	Preliminary name	Final name	Ref
Pegasus, Alder	—N/a	Windows CE 1.0	
Birch	—N/a	Windows CE 2.0	
Cedar	—N/a	Windows CE 3.0	
Talisker	Windows CE .NET	Windows CE 4.0	
Jameson	—N/a	Windows CE 4.1	
McKendric	—N/a	Windows CE 4.2	
Macallan	—N/a	Windows CE 5.0	
Yamazaki	Windows CE 6.0	Windows Embedded CE 6.0	
Chelan	Windows Embedded CE 7	Windows Embedded Compact 7	

=== Windows Mobile ===
Codename	Preliminary name	Final name	Ref
Rapier	—N/a	Pocket PC 2000	
Merlin	—N/a	Pocket PC 2002	
Ozone	—N/a	Windows Mobile 2003	
Magneto	—N/a	Windows Mobile 5	
Crossbow	—N/a	Windows Mobile 6	
6 on 6	—N/a	Windows Mobile 6.1.4	
Titanium	—N/a	Windows Mobile 6.5	
Maldives	Windows Mobile 7	Windows Phone 7	

=== Windows Phone ===
Codename	Preliminary name	Final name	Ref
Photon	Windows Mobile 7 Series	Windows Phone 7	
Mango	—N/a	Windows Phone 7.5	
Apollo	—N/a	Windows Phone 8	
Blue	—N/a	Windows Phone 8.1	
Threshold	—N/a	Windows 10 Mobile	

=== Others ===
Codename	Preliminary name	Final name	Notes	Ref
Singularity	—N/a	—N/a	Experimental operating system based on the Microsoft .NET platform, using software-based type safety as a replacement for hardware-based memory protection. Evolved into Midori.	
Midori	—N/a	—N/a	A managed code operating system being developed by Microsoft with joint effort of Microsoft Research.	
Red Dog	Windows Cloud	Azure	Microsoft cloud services platform	
Tahiti	—N/a	—N/a	Supposedly a family of multi-core technologies including an operating system, applications and development tools designed to make better use of today's multi-core CPUs. Midori may be a part of this suite of new Microsoft technologies.	
Tokyo	Azure AD Cloud App Discovery	Cloud App Discovery	Azure-based data-directory service designed to help connect the right people to the right data.	
Zurich	—N/a	.NET Services	Part of Microsoft Azure, Microsoft's cloud computing platform, that focuses on extended software development based on .NET Framework to the cloud.	

== OS components ==
Codename	Preliminary name	Final name	Notes	Ref
Anaheim	—N/a	Microsoft Edge	A rewrite of Microsoft's web browser, based on the Chromium project.	
Barcelona	—N/a	Windows Defender Application Guard	A security feature for running the Microsoft Edge web browser inside a virtual machine, thus isolating it from the rest of the system in the event that it was hacked.	
Beihai		Paint 3D	3D version of Microsoft Paint	
Code Integrity Rooting	Secure Startup	BitLocker	A security feature that checks and validates the integrity of Windows boot and system components.	
Continuum	Tablet Mode	Continuum	A Windows 10 feature that enables hybrid devices to switch between tablet mode and desktop mode. An immediately manifest effect is the Start screen getting maximized in tablet mode.	
Cornerstone	Secure Startup	BitLocker	Full disk encryption feature introduced in Windows Vista and present in subsequent versions that utilizes the Trusted Platform Module to perform integrity checking prior to operating system startup.	
Assistant	—N/a	Cortana	An intelligent personal assistant included with Windows 10, named after an artificial intelligence character in Halo	
Cougar	—N/a	VMM32	32-bit kernel	
Darwin	Microsoft Installer	Windows Installer	A Windows service and application programming interface for installing software on computers running Microsoft Windows operating systems	
Frosting	—N/a	Microsoft Plus! for Windows 95		
Hydra	—N/a	Terminal Services, Windows Terminal Server	Terminal Server adds "multiheading" support to Windows (the ability to run multiple instances of the graphics subsystem), and the hydra is a mythological monster with multiple heads.	
Jaguar	—N/a	—N/a	16-bit DOS kernel for Windows 95 based on MS-DOS 5.0, used by Windows 95 boot loader and compatibility layer.	
Jupiter	—N/a	WinRT XAML	A new application framework on Windows 8 used to create cross-platform "immersive" apps.	
Monad	MSH, Microsoft Shell	Windows PowerShell	"Monads", according to philosopher Gottfried Leibniz's monadology, are the ultimate elements of the universe, individual percipient beings, and MSH is similarly composed of small, individual modules the user puts in interrelation.	
Morro	—N/a	Microsoft Security Essentials	MSE was codenamed after the Morro de São Paulo beach in Brazil.	
Neon	—N/a	Fluent Design	Microsoft Fluent Design System is a revamp of the Windows UI based around five key components: Light, Depth, Motion, Material, and Scale.	
O'Hare	—N/a	Internet Explorer 1	Internet Explorer 1, first shipped in Microsoft Plus! for Windows 95: The codename O'Hare ties into the Chicago codename for Windows 95: O'Hare International Airport is the largest airport in the city of Chicago, Illinois — in Microsoft's words, "a point of departure to distant places from Chicago".	
Panther	—N/a	—N/a	Cancelled. Panther was a 32-bit kernel based on Windows NT kernel.	
Pinball	—N/a	High Performance File System (HPFS)	"Pinball" is the nickname (as opposed to a codename) for HPFS because HPFS driver in Windows NT 3.5 is called PINBALL.SYS.	
Piton	—N/a	ReadyDrive	Feature introduced in Windows Vista to support hybrid drives	
Protogon	—N/a	ReFS	The successor of NTFS	
Rincon	—N/a	Internet Explorer 7	Rincon is a surfing beach in Puerto Rico	
Spartan	—N/a	Microsoft Edge [Legacy]	Web browser first introduced in Windows 10, which uses EdgeHTML rendering engine. Refers to Spartans in Halo.	
Stimpy	—N/a	Windows Shell	Applies to Windows 95 only.	
Viridian	—N/a	Hyper-V	Virtualization update for Windows Server 2008	
WinFS	—N/a	—N/a	A cancelled data storage and management system project based on relational databases, first demonstrated in 2003 as an advanced storage subsystem for the Microsoft Windows, designed for persistence and management of structured, semi-structured as well as unstructured data.	
Cascadia	—N/a	Windows Terminal	A terminal emulator for Windows 10.	

== Microsoft Servers ==
=== SQL Server family ===
Codename	Final name	Notes	Ref
SQLNT	SQL Server 4.21		
SQL95	SQL Server 6.0		
Hydra	SQL Server 6.5		
Sphinx	SQL Server 7.0		
Plato	OLAP Services 7.0	"OLAP Services" was later renamed Microsoft Analysis Services	
Shiloh	SQL Server 2000	Version 8	
Rosetta	Reporting Services in SQL Server 2000		
Yukon	SQL Server 2005	Version 9	
Picasso	Analysis Services in SQL Server 2005		
Katmai	SQL Server 2008	Version 10	
Kilimanjaro	SQL Server 2008 R2	Version 10.5	
Blue	SQL Server 2008 Report Designer 2.0	This is the standalone release of the tool for Reporting Services. It must not be confused with Report Builder 2.0.	
Denali	SQL Server 2012	Version 11	
Juneau	SQL Server Data Tools	Was included in SQL Server 2012, later released as a standalone downloadable application	
Crescent	Power View	A data visualisation tool that originally shipped as part of SQL Server 2012, later an add-in for Microsoft Excel	
SQL14	SQL Server 2014	Version 12	
Hekaton	SQL Server In-Memory OLTP	In-memory database engine built into SQL Server 2014	
SQL16	SQL Server 2016	Version 13	
Helsinki	SQL Server 2017	Version 14	
Seattle	SQL Server 2019	Version 15	
Aris	SQL Server Big Data Clusters	Announced at Microsoft Ignite 2018 event on September 24–28. Retirement announced for Feb-28 2025	
Dallas	SQL Server 2022	Version 16. Public preview available for download. Announced at Microsoft Build 2022 event on May 24	

=== Others ===
Codename	Final name	Ref
Hermes	Microsoft System Management Server 1.0	
Catapult	Microsoft Proxy Server 1.0	
Geneva	Active Directory Federation Services	
Falcon	Microsoft Message Queue Server	
Viper	Microsoft Transaction Server	
Normandy	Microsoft's Commercial Internet System (CIS)	
Stirling	Microsoft Forefront Protection Suite	

== Developers tools ==
=== Visual Studio family ===
Codename	Preliminary name	Final name	Notes	Ref
Thunder		Visual Basic 1.0	The first version of Visual Basic. The standard dialogs and controls created by the Visual Basic runtime library all have "Thunder" as a prefix of their internal type names (for example, buttons are internally known as ThunderCommandButton).	
Escher		Microsoft Visual Basic for MS-DOS		
Dolphin		Microsoft Visual C++ 2.0		
Zamboni		Microsoft Visual C++ 4.1	After Zamboni, an ice resurfacing machine.	
Boston		Microsoft Visual Studio 97	Named for Boston, Massachusetts	
Cuervo		Microsoft Visual Basic 5.0 Control Creation Edition		
Aspen		Microsoft Visual Studio 6.0	Named after the popular ski destination Aspen, Colorado	
Cassini Web Server		ASP.NET Development Server	The lightweight local Web server that is launched in Visual Studio in order to test Web projects	
Hatteras	Visual Studio Team System's Source Control System	—N/a	Named after the Cape Hatteras Lighthouse in the Outer Banks region of North Carolina	
Ocracoke	Visual Studio Team System load testing suite	—N/a	Named after the Ocracoke Island Lighthouse on Ocracoke Island, also in North Carolina	
Currituck	Team Foundation Work Item Tracking	—N/a	Named after the Currituck Beach Lighthouse in Corolla, North Carolina	
Bodie	Team Foundation Server SDK	—N/a	Named after the Bodie Island Lighthouse in North Carolina	
Tuscany		Online version of Visual Studio.	Currently a research project	
Phoenix		—N/a	A Microsoft research software development kit	
Eaglestone		Visual Studio Team Explorer Everywhere	This is the name given to the Teamprise suite Microsoft acquired. The product is now named Visual Studio Team Explorer Everywhere	
KittyHawk		Visual Studio LightSwitch	RAD tool aimed at non-programmers	
Rainier		Visual Studio .NET (2002)	Named for Mount Rainier, a volcanic mountain peak visible from the Seattle area (where Microsoft is based)	
Everett		Visual Studio .NET 2003	Named after the town Everett, Washington, in Washington state	
Whidbey		Visual Studio 2005	Named after Whidbey Island in the Puget Sound	
Orcas		Visual Studio 2008	Named after Orcas Island in the Puget Sound	
Camano	Microsoft Test and Lab Manager	Microsoft Test Manager, a part of Visual Studio 2010 Test Professional, Premium and Ultimate editions	Named after Camano Island in the Puget Sound	
Rosario		Visual Studio Ultimate 2010 (formerly Team System or Team Suite)		
Cider		—N/a	Visual Studio designer for building Windows Presentation Foundation applications, meant to be used by application developers	
Monaco		Monaco Editor	In-browser IDE for Visual Studio. Monaco powers Visual Studio Code.	

=== .NET Framework family ===
Codename	Final name	Notes	Ref
Astoria	WCF Data Services	Enables the creation and consumption of OData services for the web	
Atlas	ASP.NET AJAX	An implementation for ASP.NET of Ajax native to .NET Framework 2.0	
Avalon	Windows Presentation Foundation	Graphical subsystem released as part of .NET Framework 3.0	
Fusion	—N/a	.NET Framework subsystem for locating and loading assemblies, including GAC management	
Hailstorm	.NET My Services		
Indigo	Windows Communication Foundation	An application programming interface (API) in .NET Framework for building connected, service-oriented applications	
Jolt	Silverlight 1.0		
Lightning, Project 42	.NET Framework 1.0	Project Lightning was the original codename for the Common Language Runtime in 1997. The team was based in building 42, hence Project 42.	
Project 7	—N/a	Early program to recruit implementors of both commercial and academic languages to target the Common Language Runtime. 7 was a prime factor of 42, metaphorizing the relationship between Project 7 and Project 42 (see above).	
Roslyn	.NET Compiler Platform	Open-source project that exposes programmatic access to compilers via corresponding APIs	

=== Languages ===
Codename	Final name	Notes	Ref
Clarity	Language Integrated Query (LINQ)	LINQ Language extensions to expose query syntax natively to languages such as Visual Basic .NET and C#	
D	M	Modelling language	
Jakarta	Visual J++	Named after the capital of Indonesia, Jakarta	
Metro	Microsoft Design language	A typography-based design language	

=== Others ===
Codename	Final name	Notes	Ref
Godot	Microsoft Layer for Unicode	Named after the play Waiting for Godot (centered around the endless wait for a man named "Godot" who never comes), because it was felt to be long overdue.	
Volta	—N/a	A developer toolset for building multi-tier web applications	
Project Centennial	Desktop App Converter	Allows developers to re-package existing desktop apps into the APPX format of Universal Windows Platform and sell them in Windows Store.	

== Gaming hardware ==
Codename	Final name	Notes	Ref
DirectX Box	Xbox		
Natal	Kinect	Motion sensitive control system.	
Xenon	Xbox 360	Successor to the original Xbox.	
Durango	Xbox One	Successor to Xbox 360.	
Edmonton	Xbox One S	Xbox One with 4K and HEVC Support.	
Scorpio	Xbox One X	Upgrade to Xbox One, announced at Electronic Entertainment Expo 2016. Has 6 TFLOPS GPU and 8-core CPU.	
Scarlett	Xbox Series X|S	Project name for a family of next-gen consoles. Xbox Anaconda and Xbox Lockhart are both part of Project Scarlet. Announced by Microsoft at E3 2018.	
Anaconda	Xbox Series X	Successor to Xbox One. Higher end model. Announced by Microsoft at The Game Awards 2019. Later called "Starkville"	Xbox Series X|S
Lockhart	Xbox Series S	Potential lower end model for a cheaper price. Was announced by Microsoft in September 2020. Would be successor to Xbox One S. Later called "Edith".	
Ellewood	Xbox Series S - 1TB Digital Edition	Codename for the Xbox Series S - 1TB Digital Edition console.	
Brooklin	Xbox Series X - 2TB Galaxy Black Special Edition	Codename for the Xbox Series X - 2TB Galaxy Black Special Edition console.	
Edinburgh		Originally spotted by software developer bllyhlbrt on Twitter, a new codename, Xbox Edinburgh, can be seen within the Xbox One's operating system, underneath Lockhart and Anaconda.	
Count		One of the codenames originally spotted by software developer bllyhlbrt on Twitter.	
Helix		Successor to the Xbox Series X|S. Announced by Microsoft on Twitter March 5, 2026.	

== Office software ==
Codename	Preliminary name	Final name	Notes	Ref
Albany		Microsoft Equipt	Microsoft's all-in-one, subscription-based service for office, communication, and security software	
Bandit		Schedule+ 1.0	Microsoft's first Personal Information Manager	
Barney		Money 1.0	Microsoft's personal finance software (Flintstones theme)	
Betty		Money 2.0		
Budapest		Microsoft Office Communicator Web Access 2005		
Bullet		Microsoft Mail 3.0	Microsoft's first LAN-based email product written in-house	
Cirrus		Microsoft Access 1.0		
CRM V1.0, Tsunami		Microsoft CRM 1.0	The platform was initially codenamed Tsunami, but once the decision was made to make it an actual product it was just changed to the initials as the initials were enough of a codename.	
Danube Phase I		Microsoft CRM 1.2		
Danube Phase II		Microsoft CRM 3		
Dino		Microsoft Money 3.0		
Kilimanjaro	Titan	Microsoft CRM 4	Was originally Kilimanjaro but changed to Titan, as Kilimanjaro was too difficult to spell	
Deco		Microsoft PhotoDraw		
Greenwich	Real-Time Communications Server 2003	Microsoft Office Live Communications Server 2003		
Istanbul		Microsoft Office Communicator 2005		
Maestro		Microsoft Office Business Scorecard Manager 2005		
Odyssey		Microsoft Excel		
Opus		Word for Windows v1.0 for Windows 2.x		
Oslo	Microsoft BizTalk Server SOA, SQL Server Modeling CTP	—N/a	Set of Service-oriented architecture (SOA) technologies	
Ren, Stimpy	Wren	Microsoft Outlook	"Stimpy" was merged into "Ren", which later became "Wren". "Ren" and "Stimpy" are references to Ren and Stimpy, characters of an American animated television series. "Wren", a homophone of "Ren", is a reference to Christopher Wren, the architect of St Paul's Cathedral.	
Rigel		Skype Room Systems	A meeting room system designed to interface with Skype	
Tahiti	Microsoft SharedView	—N/a	A screen sharing tool which allows users to take over sessions and interact with remote desktops. No audio or conference facilities.	
Tahoe		SharePoint Portal Server 2001		
Utopia		Microsoft Bob	Intended to be a user-friendly GUI	

== Other codenames ==
Codename	Preliminary name	Final name	Notes	Ref
Acropolis		—N/a	Application framework for Smart Clients	
Aero Diamond		—N/a	Used during the development of Windows Vista to describe a set of advanced user interface effects for the Desktop Window Manager to be introduced after Vista's release	
Alexandria		Zune Marketplace	An online music store	
Argo		Zune	A digital media player	
Atlanta		—N/a	A cloud service that monitors Microsoft SQL Server deployments	
Baraboo		Microsoft HoloLens		
Blackbird		—N/a	An online content-authoring platform centered around the concept of distributed Object Linking and Embedding (OLE) and meant to be an alternative to HTML. The developer tools were originally released in beta and some titles were made available on MSDN before it was scrapped in favor of web development around ASP and ActiveX and the designer was refashioned into Visual InterDev.	
Concur		—N/a	Aims to: define higher-level abstractions (above "threads and locks"); for today's imperative languages; that evenly support the range of concurrency granularities; to let developers write correct and efficient concurrent applications; with much latent parallelism; that can be efficiently mapped to the user's.	
Dallas		—N/a	Aims to help discover, purchase and manage, premium data subscriptions in the Windows Azure platform	
Dorado		Zune PC Client		
Eldorado		MVP Reconnect	Program to recognize alumni of Microsoft's Most Valuable Professional award program when they left the program in good standing or were not re-awarded.	
HailStorm		.NET My Services	Collection of web services centered around the storage and retrieval of information. Cancelled before it could fully materialize.	
Honolulu		Windows Admin Center		
Ibiza		Azure Portal	Website for managing cloud resources	
Kratos		PowerApps	Software for building and sharing native, mobile, and Web apps	
Kumo		Bing	Microsoft's set of features improving Live Search search engine	
Marvel		The Microsoft Network	The classic version of MSN, originally as a proprietary, "walled garden" online service	
Media2Go		Windows Mobile software for Portable Media Centers	Platform built on Windows Mobile found on portable media players	
Metro		Open XML Paper Specification (XPS)		
Milan	Surface	Microsoft PixelSense	Table-top style computer with multi-touch touchscreen interface	
Mira		—N/a	Windows CE .NET-based technology for smart displays	
Monaco		—N/a	Music-making program similar to Apple GarageBand application	
Origami		Ultra-Mobile PC		
Palladium	Trusted Windows	—N/a	Effort to develop a small, very secure operating environment within Windows, including curtained memory, trusted input, and graphics. Project renamed to Next-Generation Secure Computing Base, and was never fully implemented.	
Softsled		—N/a	Software based Windows Media Center Extender	
Springfield	Microsoft Popfly	—N/a	Website in Alpha testing stage providing mashup and webpages creation tools, with publishing as Rich Internet Application option	
Sydney	Bing Chat	Copilot		
Wolverine		TCP/IP stack for Windows for Workgroups 3.11	Named after the Wolverine, a character from Marvel Comics.	
Pink		Microsoft Kin		
