= Proof of concept =

Realization of a certain method or idea in order to demonstrate its feasibility

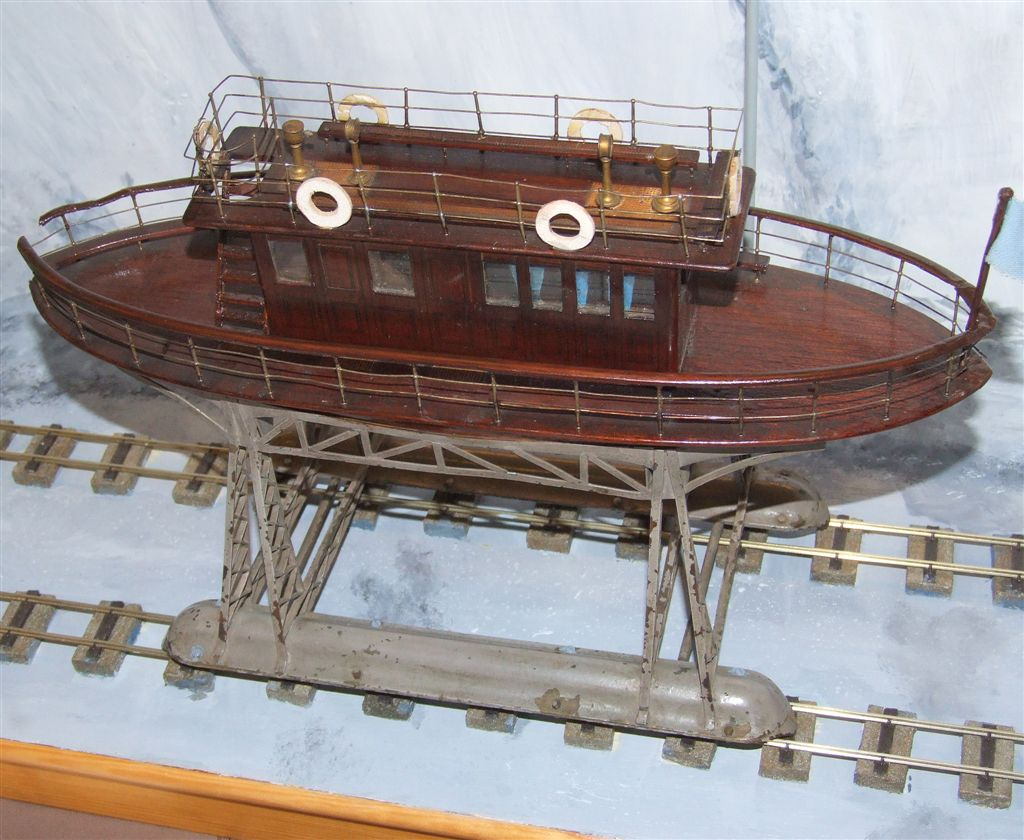
A proof-of-concept model of a Brighton and Rottingdean Seashore Electric Railway car

A proof of concept (POC or PoC), also known as proof of principle, is an inchoate realization of a certain idea or method in order to demonstrate its feasibility or viability. A proof of concept is usually small and may or may not be complete, but aims to demonstrate in principle that the concept has practical potential without needing to fully develop it.

A proof of value (PoV) is sometimes used along proof of concept, and differs by focusing more on demonstrating the potential customer use case and value, and is usually less in-depth than a proof of concept.

== Usage history ==
The term has been in use since 1967. In a 1969 hearing of the Committee on Science and Astronautics, Subcommittee on Advanced Research and Technology, proof of concept was defined as following:

The Board defined proof of concept as a phase in development in which experimental hardware is constructed and tested to explore and demonstrate the feasibility of a new concept.

One definition of the term "proof of concept" was by Bruce Carsten in the context of a "proof-of-concept prototype" in his magazine column "Carsten's Corner" (1989):

Proof-of-Concept Prototype is a term that (I believe) I coined in 1984. It was used to designate a circuit constructed along lines similar to an engineering prototype, but one in which the intent was only to demonstrate the feasibility of a new circuit and/or a fabrication technique, and was not intended to be an early version of a production design.

The column also provided definitions for the related but distinct terms 'breadboard' (a term used since 1940), 'prototype', 'engineering prototype', and 'brassboard'.

== Examples ==
=== Filmmaking ===
Sky Captain and the World of Tomorrow, 300, and Sin City were all shot in front of a greenscreen with almost all backgrounds and props computer-generated. All three used proof-of-concept short films. In the case of Sin City, the short film became the prologue of the final film.

Pixar sometimes creates short animated films that use a difficult or untested technique. Their short film Geri's Game used techniques for animation of cloth and of human facial expressions later used in Toy Story 2. Similarly, Pixar created several short films as proofs of concept for new techniques for water motion, sea anemone tentacles, and a slowly appearing whale in preparation for the production of Finding Nemo.

=== Engineering ===
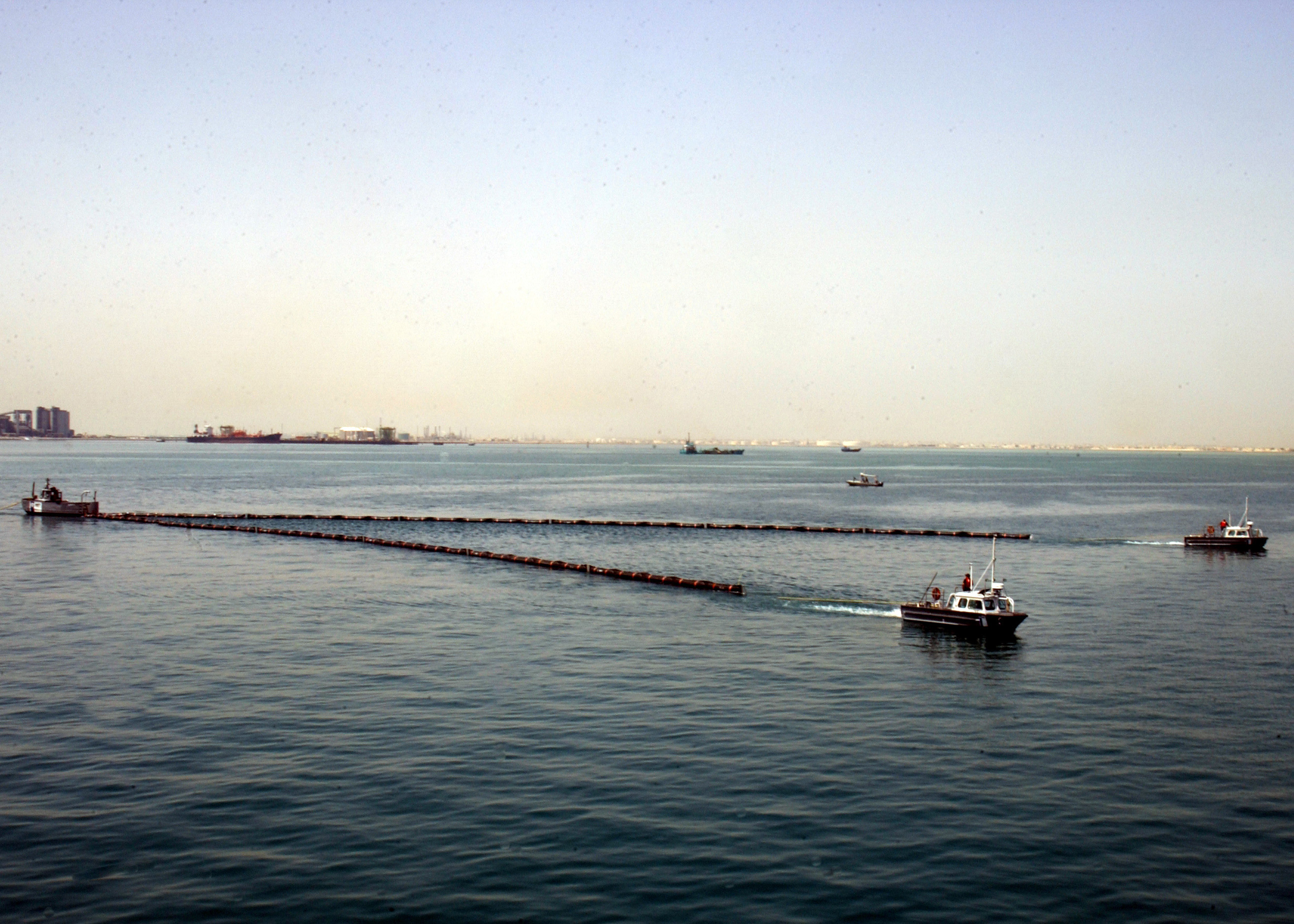
Proof of concept testing of oil cleanup equipment

In engineering and technology, a rough prototype of a new idea is often constructed as a "proof of concept". For example, a working concept of an electrical device may be constructed using a breadboard. A patent application often requires a demonstration of functionality prior to being filed. Some universities have proof of concept centers to "fill the 'funding gap'" for "seed-stage investing" and "accelerate the commercialization of university innovations". Proof of concept centers provide "seed funding to novel, early stage research that most often would not be funded by any other conventional source".

=== Business development ===
In the field of business development and sales, a vendor may allow a prospect customer to try a product. This use of proof of concept helps establish viability, isolate technical issues, and suggest an overall direction, as well as provide feedback for budgeting and other forms of internal decision-making processes.

In these cases, the proof of concept may mean the use of specialized sales engineers to ensure that the vendor makes a best-possible effort.

=== Security ===
In both computer security and encryption, proof of concept refers to a demonstration that in principle shows how a system may be protected or compromised, without the necessity of building a complete working vehicle for that purpose. Winzapper was a proof of concept which possessed the bare minimum of capabilities needed to selectively remove an item from the Windows Security Log, but it was not optimized in any way.

=== Software development ===
In software development, the term 'proof of concept' often characterizes several distinct processes with different objectives and participant roles: vendor business roles may utilize a proof of concept to establish whether a system satisfies some aspect of the purpose it was designed for. Once a vendor is satisfied, a prototype is developed which is then used to seek funding or to demonstrate to prospective customers.

The US General Services Administration has a checklist for defining an Agile software proof of concept, which includes clear definitions of the problem, pre-POC input required, and output criteria (including success criteria).

The key benefits of the proof of concept in software development are:

- The possibility to choose the best technology stack for the software (application or web platform)
- A higher probability of investors' interest in the future software product
- The ability to simplify and improve the ease of testing and validating ideas for the software's functionality
- Receiving valuable feedback of a target audience (users) even before building a full-scope system
- Onboarding first clients before an official software release

A 'steel thread' is technical proof of concept that touches all of the technologies in a solution. By contrast, a 'proof of technology' aims to determine the solution to some technical problem (such as how two systems might integrate) or to demonstrate that a given configuration can achieve a certain throughput. No business users need be involved in a proof of technology.

A pilot project refers to an initial roll-out of a system into production, targeting a limited scope of the intended final solution. The scope may be limited by the number of users who can access the system, the business processes affected, the business partners involved, or other restrictions as appropriate to the domain. The purpose of a pilot project is to test, often in a production environment.

Tech demos are designed as proof of concept for the development of video games. They can demonstrate graphical or gameplay capabilities crucial for particular games.

=== Drug development ===
Although not suggested by natural language, and in contrast to usage in other areas, proof of principle and proof of concept are not synonymous in drug development. A third term, proof of mechanism, is closely related and is also described here. All of these terms lack rigorous definitions and exact usage varies between authors, between institutions and over time. The descriptions given below are intended to be informative and practically useful.

The underlying principle is related to the use of biomarkers as surrogate endpoints in early clinical trials. In early development it is not practical to directly measure that a drug is effective in treating the desired disease, and a surrogate endpoint is used to guide whether or not it is appropriate to proceed with further testing. For example, although it cannot be determined early that a new antibiotic cures patients with pneumonia, early indicators would include that the drug is effective in killing bacteria in laboratory tests, or that it reduces temperature in infected patients—such a drug would merit further testing to determine the appropriate dose and duration of treatment. A new anti-hypertension drug could be shown to reduce blood pressure, indicating that it would be useful to conduct more extensive testing of long-term treatment in the expectation of showing reductions in stroke (cerebrovascular accident) or heart attack (myocardial infarction). Surrogate endpoints are often based on laboratory blood tests or imaging investigations like X-ray or CT scan.

- Proof of mechanism or PoM relates to the earliest stages of drug development, often pre-clinical (i.e., before trialling the drug on humans, or before trialling with research animals). It could be based on showing that the drug interacts with the intended molecular receptor or enzyme, and/or affects cell biochemistry in the desired manner and direction.
- Proof of principle or PoP relates to early clinical development and typically refers to an evaluation of the effect of a new treatment on disease biomarkers, but not the clinical endpoints of the condition. Early stage clinical trials may aim to demonstrate Proof of Mechanism, or Proof of Principle, or both. A decision is made at this point as to whether to progress the drug into later development, or if it should be dropped.
- Proof of concept or PoC refers to early clinical drug development, conventionally divided into the phases of clinical research Phase I ("first-in-humans") and Phase IIA.

Phase I is typically conducted with a small number of healthy volunteers who are given single doses or short courses of treatment (e.g., up to 2 weeks). Studies in this phase aim to show that the new drug has some of the desired clinical activity (e.g., that an experimental anti-hypertensive drug actually has some effect on reducing blood pressure), that it can be tolerated when given to humans, and to give guidance as to dose levels that are worthy of further study. Other Phase I studies aim to investigate how the new drug is absorbed, distributed, metabolised and excreted (ADME studies).

Phase IIA is typically conducted in up to 100 patients with the disease of interest. Studies in this Phase aim to show that the new drug has a useful amount of the desired clinical activity (e.g., that an experimental anti-hypertensive drug reduces blood pressure by a useful amount), that it can be tolerated when given to humans in the longer term, and to investigate which dose levels might be most suitable for eventual marketing.

A decision is made at this point as to whether to progress the drug into later development, or if it should be dropped. If the drug continues, it will progress into later stage clinical studies, termed Phase IIB and Phase III.

Phase III studies involve larger numbers of patients—commonly multicenter trials—treated at doses and durations representative of marketed use, and in randomised comparison to placebo and/or existing active drugs. They aim to show convincing, statistically significant evidence of efficacy and to give a better assessment of safety than is possible in smaller, short-term studies.

A decision is made at this point as to whether the drug is effective and safe, and if so an application is made to regulatory authorities (such as the US Food and Drug Administration FDA and the European Medicines Agency) for the drug to receive permission to be marketed for use outside of clinical trials.

Clinical trials can continue after marketing authorization has been received, for example, to better delineate safety, to determine appropriate use alongside other drugs or to investigate additional uses.

== See also ==
- 3D printing
- Case study
- Concept car
- Feasibility study
- PoC||GTFO
- Prototype
- Sanity testing
- State of the art
- Technology readiness level
- Technology demonstration
- Trinity (nuclear test)
