= IGF =

IGF may stand for:

- Insulin-like growth factor
- Independent Games Festival
- Internet Governance Forum
- Identity Governance Framework
- Inoki Genome Federation
- International Golf Federation
- International Genetics Federation
- International Graphical Federation, a former global union federation
- Israeli Ground Forces
- International Go Federation
- Induced gas flotation
