= Liberty Alliance =

Computer trade group

Liberty Alliance Project
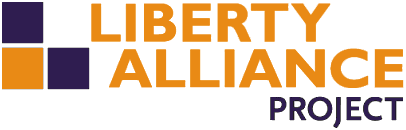
- Successor: Kantara Initiative
- Established: September 2001
- Dissolved: 2009
- Purpose: Industry standards group

The Liberty Alliance Project was an organization formed in September 2001 to establish standards, guidelines and best practices for identity management in computer systems. It grew to more than 150 organizations, including technology vendors, consumer-facing companies, educational organizations and governments. It released frameworks for federation, identity assurance, an Identity Governance Framework, and Identity Web Services.

By 2009, the Kantara Initiative took over the work of the Liberty Alliance.

Liberty actors

== History ==
The group was originally conceived and named by Jeff Veis, at Sun Microsystems based in Menlo Park, California. The initiative's goal, which was personally promoted by Scott McNealy of Sun, was to unify technology, commercial and government organizations to create a standard for federated, identity-based Internet applications as an alternative to technology appearing in the marketplace controlled by a single entity such as Microsoft's Passport. Another Microsoft initiative, HailStorm, was renamed My Services but quietly shelved by April 2002. Sun positioned the group as independent, and Eric C. Dean of United Airlines became its president.

=== Identity federation ===
Liberty Alliance 2002–2005

In July 2002, the alliance announced Liberty Identity Federation (ID-FF) 1.0. At that time, several member companies announced upcoming availability of Liberty-enabled products. Liberty Federation allowed consumers and users of Internet-based services and e-commerce applications to authenticate and sign-on to a network or domain once from any device and then visit or take part in services from multiple Websites. This federated approach did not require the user to re-authenticate and can support privacy controls established by the user.

The Liberty Alliance subsequently released two more versions of the Identity Federation Framework, and then in November 2003, Liberty contributed its final version of the specification, ID-FF 1.2, to OASIS. This contribution formed the basis for SAML 2.0. By 2007, industry analyst firm Gartner claimed that SAML had gained wide acceptance in the community.

=== Identity web services ===
Liberty Alliance, releasing the Liberty Identity Web Services Framework (ID-WSF) in April 2004 for deploying and managing identity-based web services. Applications included geolocation, contact book, calendar, mobile messaging and People Service, for managing social applications such as bookmarks, blogs, calendars, photo sharing and instant messaging in a secure and privacy-respecting federated social network. In a 2008 marketing report recommended considering it for federation.

=== Certification ===
The alliance introduced a certification program in 2003, designed to test commercial and open source products against published standards to assure base levels of interoperability between products. In 2007, the US General Services Administration began requiring this certification for participating in the US E-Authentication Identity Federation.

=== Openliberty.org ===
In January 2007, the alliance announced a project for open-source software developers building identity-based applications. OpenLiberty.org was a portal where developers can collaborate and access tools and information to develop applications based on alliance standards. In November 2008, OpenLiberty released an open source application programming interface called ArisID.

=== Identity governance framework ===
In February 2007 Oracle Corporation contributed the Identity Governance Framework to the alliance, which released the first version publicly in July 2007. The Identity Governance Framework defined how identity related information is used, stored, and propagated using protocols such as LDAP, Security Assertion Markup Language, WS-Trust, and ID-WSF.

=== Identity assurance framework ===
The Liberty Alliance began work on its identity assurance framework in 2008. The Identity Assurance Framework (IAF) detailed four identity assurance levels designed to link trusted identity-enabled enterprise, social networking and Web applications together based on business rules and security risks associated with each level. The four levels of assurance were outlined by a 2006 document from the US National Institute of Standards and Technology. The level of assurance provided is measured by the strength and rigor of the identity proofing process, the credential's strength, and the management processes the service provider applies to it. These four assurance levels were adopted by UK, Canada, and USA government services.

=== Concordia project ===
In 2007 the Liberty Alliance helped to found the Project Concordia, an independent initiative for harmonization identity specifications. It was active through 2008.

=== Privacy and policy ===
The alliance wrote papers on business and policy aspects of identity management. It hosted meetings in 2007 and 2008 to promote itself.

=== Membership ===
Management board members included AOL, British Telecom, Computer Associates (CA), Fidelity Investments, Intel, Internet Society (ISOC), Novell, Nippon Telegraph and Telephone (NTT), Vodafone, Oracle Corporation and Sun Microsystems.

== See also ==
- IndieAuth
- Windows CardSpace
- Yadis
- OpenID
- OAuth
- Identity management systems

Liberty ID-FF 1.2 Archive
	Contributed Documents	Archived Documents
Liberty ID-FF Architecture Overview	liberty-idff-arch-overview-v1.2.pdf	draft-liberty-idff-arch-overview-1.2-errata-v1.0.pdf
Liberty ID-FF Protocols and Schema Specification	liberty-idff-protocols-schema-v1.2.pdf liberty-idff-protocols-schema-v1.2.xsd	draft-liberty-idff-protocols-schema-1.2-errata-v3.0.pdf liberty-idff-protocols-schema-1.2-errata-v3.0.xsd
Liberty ID-FF Bindings and Profiles Specification	liberty-idff-bindings-profiles-v1.2.pdf	draft-liberty-idff-bindings-profiles-1.2-errata-v2.0.pdf
Liberty ID-FF Implementation Guidelines	draft-lib-idff-guidelines-v1.2-11.pdf	liberty-idff-guidelines-v1.2.pdf
Liberty ID-FF Static Conformance Requirements	liberty-idff-1.1-scr.v1.0.pdf	liberty-idff-1.2-scr-v1.0.pdf
Liberty Metadata Description and Discovery Specification	liberty-metadata-v1.0.pdf liberty-metadata-v1.0.xsd liberty-idff-wsdl-v1.0.wsdl	liberty-metadata-v1.1.pdf liberty-metadata-v1.1.xsd liberty-idff-wsdl-v1.1.wsdl
Liberty Authentication Context Specification	liberty-authentication-context-v1.2.pdf liberty-authentication-context-v1.2.xsd	liberty-authentication-context-v1.3.pdf liberty-authentication-context-v1.3.xsd
Liberty Utility Schema Files	liberty-utility-v1.0.xsd liberty-idff-utility-v1.0.xsd	liberty-utility-v1.1.xsd liberty-idff-utility-v1.0.xsd
Liberty Glossary	liberty-glossary-v1.2.pdf	liberty-glossary-v1.4.pdf
Liberty ID-FF 1.2 Errata		draft-liberty-idff-1.2-errata-v1.0.pdf
