= Development of Windows XP =

Microsoft software project (1999–2001)

The development of Windows XP started in 1999 as a successor to the Windows Neptune and Windows Odyssey projects. Neptune was originally going to be the successor of Windows Me, though based on the NT kernel. Microsoft merged the teams working on Neptune with that of Windows Odyssey, Windows 2000's successor, in early 2000. The resulting project, codenamed "Whistler", went on to become Windows XP.

Windows XP was released to manufacturing August 24, 2001, and the operating system was released to the general public on October 25 of the same year.

== "Neptune" and "Odyssey" ==
In the late 1990s, initial development of what would become Windows XP was focused on two individual products; "Odyssey", which was reportedly intended to succeed the future Windows 2000, and "Neptune", which was reportedly a consumer-oriented operating system using the Windows NT architecture, succeeding the MS-DOS-based Windows 98. Based on the NT 5.0 kernel in Windows 2000, Neptune primarily focused on offering a simplified, task-based interface based on a concept known internally as "activity centers", originally planned to be implemented in Windows 98. A number of activity centers were planned, serving as hubs for email communications, playing music, managing or viewing photos, searching the Internet, and viewing recently used content. A single build of Neptune, 5111 (which still carried the branding of Windows 2000 in some places), revealed early work on the activity center concept, with an updated user account interface and graphical login screen, common functions (such as recently used programs) being accessible from a customizable "Starting Places" page (which could be used as either a separate window, or a full-screen desktop replacement). It was later confirmed that Microsoft were planning a successor to Neptune known as Triton, although it was originally thought to be a service pack to Neptune.

However, the project proved to be too ambitious. Microsoft discussed a plan to delay Neptune in favor of an interim OS known as "Asteroid", which would have been an update to Windows 2000 (Windows NT 5.0), and have a consumer-oriented version. At the WinHEC conference on April 7, 1999, Steve Ballmer announced an updated version of Windows 98 known as Windows Millennium, breaking a promise made by Microsoft CEO Bill Gates in 1998 that Windows 98 would be the final consumer-oriented version of Windows to use the MS-DOS architecture. Concepts introduced by Neptune would influence future Windows products; in Windows Me, the activity center concept was used for System Restore and Help and Support Center (which both combined Win32 code with an interface rendered using Internet Explorer's layout engine), the hub concept would be expanded on Windows Phone, and Windows 8 would similarly use a simplified user interface running atop the existing Windows shell.

== "Whistler" ==
In January 2000, shortly prior to the official release of Windows 2000, technology writer Paul Thurrott reported that Microsoft had shelved both Neptune and Odyssey in favor of a new product codenamed "Whistler", after Whistler, British Columbia, as many Microsoft employees skied at the Whistler-Blackcomb ski resort. The goal of Whistler was to unify both the consumer and business-oriented Windows lines under a single, Windows NT platform: Thurrott stated that Neptune had become "a black hole when all the features that were cut from Windows Me were simply re-tagged as Neptune features. And since Neptune and Odyssey would be based on the same code-base anyway, it made sense to combine them into a single project".

Internal builds of Whistler began to be developed prior to the release of the first preview build of Whistler, some of which were mentioned in news articles such as those by ZDNet, who published an article on or before February 10, 2000 about Whistler's development mentioning an internal build of Whistler known as build 2200, which they claimed to be the first internal release of Whistler. This was corrected by Thurrott in an article published on February 13, 2000 where he claimed that build 2197 was the first internal build of Whistler and that it had gone out internally "weeks ago".

The first available build of Whistler was build 2202, compiled on February 2, 2000. While it largely resembles its predecessor, Windows 2000, it contained some changes, such as the addition of the "Comments?" link on the right-hand side of the title bar (which was previously implemented in Neptune), and references to "Windows 2001" in the Additional Drivers dialog in the Printers control panel applet for the options under AXP64 and IA-64 machines ("AXP64" and "IA-64" in particular were the 64-bit instruction set architectures (ISAs) used in the Alpha and Itanium platforms respectively). The "SD" in the watermark refers to the Source Depot version control system that Microsoft was deploying at the time. Build 2210 was the only available build of Windows that was compiled for the native Alpha 64-bit platform, AXP64, which was not intended for public release but rather as a development platform for porting Windows NT into Itanium as no other Itanium hardware existed at the time of Whistler's development. It also contains several changes and additions, some of which were carried over from Windows Me and Neptune such as the category view in Control Panel and a hidden login screen ported directly from Neptune. This build is referred to as "Whistler Windows 2001" in the watermark. Build 2211 carried over the changes and additions from build 2210. Build 2223 is the first build to update the kernel to 5.1 instead of 5.0 and featured several more changes and additions, most of which were hidden from the user. Many of these early builds of Whistler apart from builds 2197 and 2200 were leaked online throughout the early months of 2000 (build 2210 would not resurface until 2023).

At WinHEC in April 2000, Microsoft officially announced and presented an early build of Whistler, focusing on a new modularized architecture, built-in CD burning, fast user switching, and updated versions of the digital media features introduced by Me. Windows general manager Carl Stork stated that Whistler would be released in both consumer- and business-oriented versions built atop the same architecture, and that there were plans to update the Windows interface to make it "warmer and more friendly". In June 2000, Microsoft began the technical beta testing process. Whistler was expected to be made available in "Personal", "Professional", "Server", "Advanced Server", and "Datacenter" editions.

The first preview build of Whistler officially released by Microsoft was build 2250 on July 13, 2000. The build notably introduced an early version of a new visual styles system along with an interim theme known as "Professional" (later renamed "Watercolor"), which was the first theme developed to use the visual style system but was never intended to be included in the final release. It also contained a hidden "Start page" (a full-screen page similar to Neptune's "Starting Places") and a hidden, early version of a two-column Start menu design. At PDC on the same day, Microsoft announced that Whistler would be released during the second half of 2001. Build 2257 released on August 24, 2000 featured further refinements to the Watercolor theme, along with the official introduction of the two-column Start menu, and the addition of an early version of Windows Firewall.

Microsoft released build 2296, also known as Whistler Beta 1, on October 31, 2000. In January 2001, build 2410 introduced Internet Explorer 6.0 (previously branded as 5.6) and the Microsoft Product Activation system. It also introduced new icons that would resemble the ones in the final version, and also featured an additional placeholder theme known as "Sample Test Visual Style" (or "Mallard") which was offered in two color variations. Like Watercolor, Sample Test was never meant to be the final theme for Whistler; in fact, it has been stated that Microsoft created it as a decoy for testers to use until they were ready to show "Luna", the final theme for Windows XP. At the Consumer Electronics Show on January 6, 2001, Bill Gates dedicated a portion of his keynote to discuss Whistler, explaining that the OS would bring "[the] dependability of our highest end corporate desktop, and total dependability, to the home," and also "move it in the direction of making it very consumer-oriented. Making it very friendly for the home user to use." An internal build of Whistler shown at the event (build 2415, lab06_N) previewed a preliminarily version of Luna that was publicly shown off to demonstrate the new visual style that would eventually be implemented in later builds (as well as the final release). Alongside Beta 1, it was also announced that Microsoft would prioritize the release of the consumer-oriented versions of Whistler over the server-oriented versions in order to gauge reaction, but that they would be both generally available during the second half of 2001 (Whistler Server would ultimately be delayed into 2003). Builds 2416 and 2419 added the Files and Settings Transfer Wizard and began to introduce elements of the operating system's final appearance (such as its near-final Windows Setup design, and the addition of new default wallpapers, such as Bliss).

== Announcement ==
On February 5, 2001, Whistler was officially unveiled during a media event under the name Windows XP, where XP stands for "eXPerience". As a complement, the next version of Microsoft Office was also announced as Office XP. Microsoft stated that the name "[symbolizes] the rich and extended user experiences Windows and Office can offer by embracing Web services that span a broad range of devices." In a press event at EMP Museum in Seattle on February 13, 2001, Microsoft publicly unveiled the new "Luna" user interface of Windows XP; that same day, build 2428 was released to testers, officially introducing the "Luna" theme in its early stages, replacing the previous placeholder Watercolor and Sample Test themes. Windows XP Beta 2, build 2462a (which among other improvements, introduced the Luna style), was launched at WinHEC on March 25, 2001.

In April 2001, Microsoft controversially announced that XP would not integrate support for Bluetooth or USB 2.0 at launch, requiring the use of third-party drivers. Critics felt that in the case of the latter, Microsoft's decision had delivered a potential blow to the adoption of USB 2.0, as XP was to provide support for the competing, Apple-developed FireWire standard instead. A representative stated that the company had "[recognized] the importance of USB 2.0 as a newly emerging standard and is evaluating the best mechanism for making it available to Windows XP users after the initial release." USB 2.0 support was later added with Service Pack 1, and partial Bluetooth support was added with Service Pack 2.

The builds prior to and following Release Candidate 1 (build 2505, released on July 5, 2001) and Release Candidate 2 (build 2526, released on July 27, 2001) focused on fixing bugs, acknowledging user feedback, and other final tweaks before the RTM build.

== Release ==
In June 2001, Microsoft indicated that it was planning to, in conjunction with Intel and other PC makers, spend at least US$1 billion on marketing and promoting Windows XP. The theme of the campaign, "Yes You Can", was designed to emphasize the platform's overall capabilities. Microsoft had originally planned to use the slogan "Prepare to Fly", but it was replaced due to sensitivity issues in the wake of the September 11 attacks. A prominent aspect of Microsoft's campaign was a U.S. television commercial featuring Madonna's song "Ray of Light"; a Microsoft spokesperson stated that the song was chosen due to its optimistic tone and how it complemented the overall theme of the campaign.

On August 24, 2001, Windows XP build 2600 was released to manufacturing. During a ceremonial media event at Microsoft Redmond Campus, copies of the RTM build were given to representatives of several major PC manufacturers in briefcases, who then flew off on decorated helicopters. While PC manufacturers would be able to release devices running XP beginning on September 24, 2001, XP was expected to reach general, retail availability on October 25, 2001. On the same day, Microsoft also announced the final retail pricing of XP's two main editions, "Home" (as a replacement for Windows Me for home computing) and "Professional" (as a replacement for Windows 2000 for high-end users).

== Misattributed beta sounds ==
No Windows XP build has made use of or even included the widespread startup and shutdown sounds. These originate from a Whistler theme from ThemeWorld, which includes an entire sound scheme of sounds from various sources such as Plus! 98, although these are not as widespread. The first fake startup sound using Windows 98 Plus!'s World Traveler shutdown sound, PhotoDisc startup sound, and Architecture shutdown sound, and the second version using Windows 98's shutdown sound reversed, Windows 2000 build 1964 to build 2000.3's startup sound reversed, and the Next Level sound from a game titled Spring Weekend included in the Microsoft Entertainment Pack slowed down, while the shutdown sound is a startup sound from BeOS, albeit downsampled. Additionally, it was also rumored that Whistler used the startup and shutdown sounds from Windows 2000 build 1964 to build 2000.3.

In actuality, all builds prior to 2481 use the same sounds as Windows 2000 and Me. Build 2481 introduced the sounds used in the final release (albeit in stereo and 44.1 kHz), but they were not used by default until build 2485 (in which they were downsampled).

== See also ==
- Windows 2000
- Windows Me
- Windows XP
- History of Microsoft Windows
- Development of Windows 95
- Development of Windows Vista
