= Windows Neptune =

Cancelled Microsoft product

- Version of the Windows NT operating system

- Neptune build 5111's desktop
- Developer: Microsoft
- Working state: Historic, never released
- Latest preview: 5.00.5111 (kernel reports); 5.50.5111 (version in many files) / December 27, 1999; 26 years ago
- Marketing target: Consumer
- Kernel type: Hybrid (NT)
- License: Non-disclosure agreement

Support status
- Cancelled

Neptune was the codename for a version of Microsoft Windows under development in 1999. Based on Windows 2000, it was originally intended to replace the Windows 9x series and was scheduled to be the first home consumer-oriented version of Windows built on Windows NT code. Internally, the project's name was capitalized as NepTune.

Neptune largely resembled Windows 2000, but some new features were introduced. Neptune included a logon screen similar to that later used in Windows XP. A firewall new to Neptune was later integrated into Windows XP as the Windows Firewall. Neptune also experimented with a new HTML and Win32-based user interface originally intended for Windows Me, called Activity Centers, for task-centered operations.

== History ==
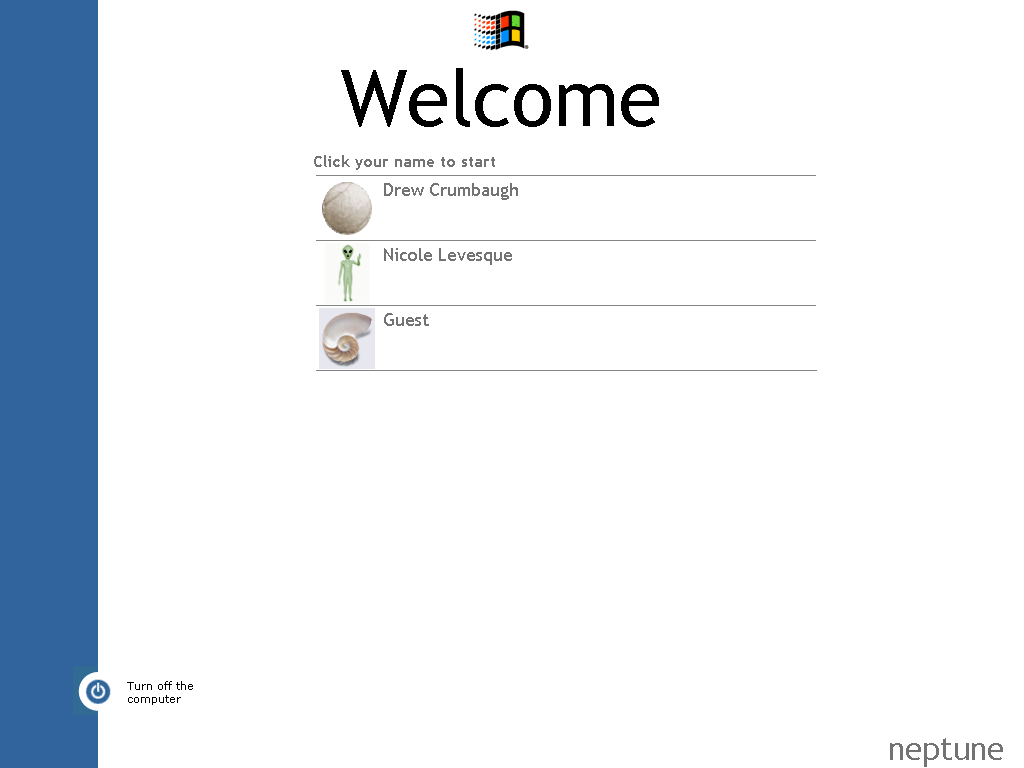
Neptune login screen

Only one alpha build of Neptune, 5111, was released to testers under a non-disclosure agreement, and later made its way to various beta collectors' sites and virtual museums after it was leaked in 2000. It is the only build of Neptune that made its way to the public. Other builds of Neptune are known to exist due to information in beta builds of Windows Me and Windows XP; a build 5111.6 burn lab disc was also shown during a Microsoft Channel 9 video in November 2015. Build 5111 was the last build of Neptune that was sent to external testers before the project was cancelled in early 2000; the .1 or .6 after the build number stood for variant, not for compile.

Build 5111 included Activity Centers - a new task-based user interface that featured individual "pages" focusing on daily tasks with facilities that include (but are not limited to) browsing the Internet, communication, document management and entertainment. It is not installed by default, however, and must be installed by copying ACCORE.DLL from the installation disk to the hard drive and then running regsvr32 on ACCORE.DLL. The Activity Centers contained traces of Windows Me, then code-named Millennium, of which it was originally developed for, but were broken due to JavaScript errors, missing links and executables to the Game, Photo, and Music Centers. In response, some Windows enthusiasts have spent years fixing Activity Centers in build 5111 close to what Microsoft intended.

User management was also improved in Neptune with the introduction of several new user types as well as a dedicated full-screen user interface. The new interfaces were primarily implemented using Internet Explorer's web technology, often using the then-new Mars framework. A key focus of the Neptune project was to experiment with user experiences that did not require manually saving previous work; some of this effort is visible in the only available build, which enables hibernation by default and requires the user to take extra steps to fully shut down the device.

In early 2000, Microsoft merged the team working on Neptune with that developing Odyssey, the successor to Windows 2000 for business customers. The combined team worked on a new project codenamed Whistler, which was released at the end of 2001 as Windows XP. In the meantime, Microsoft released Windows Me in 2000 as their final 9x series installment. Early development builds of Whistler feature an improved version of the logon screen found in Neptune build 5111.

== Triton ==
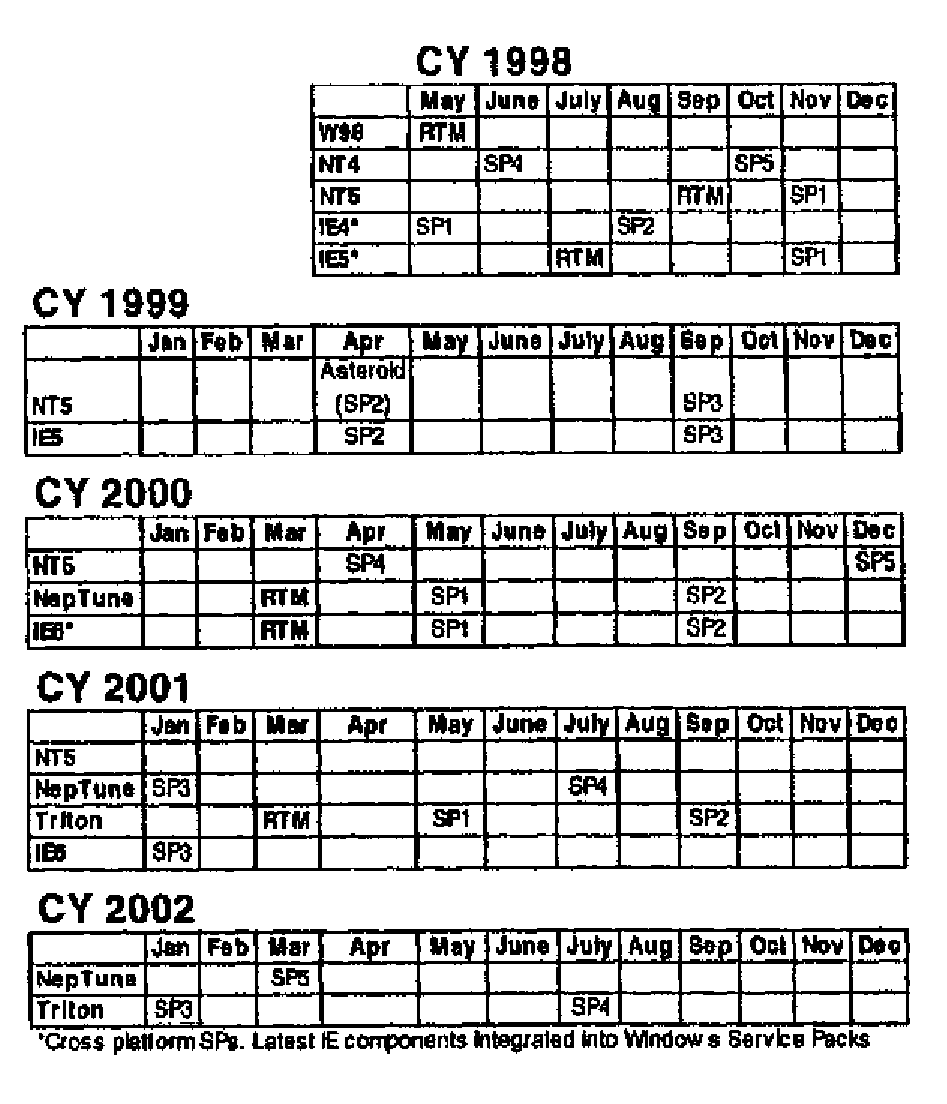
Internal Microsoft calendar of service pack release dates for Neptune, NT 5.0, and Triton

Neptune was intended to have a successor named Triton, which was to be a minor update with very few user interface changes; service packs were additionally planned for it. Triton was slated for a spring 2002 release (coinciding with Microsoft's final fiscal quarter of 2001). Triton was devised back in 1998 alongside Neptune; the only details of it within Microsoft's internal planning documentation that year relate to a deadline for added hardware support by December 2001.

According to Paul Thurrott, the timeline of releases was to be Windows NT 5.0 (a preliminary name for Windows 2000) for high-end workstations and Windows 98 for entry-level and mid-range PCs from 1998 to 1999, followed by Neptune in 2000 and 2001 for both workstations and consumer PCs, followed by Triton for the same target audience. However, Charlie Kindel stated that Triton was to be a version of Neptune centered on home server usage.

The project's codename refers to Neptune's largest moon, Triton.

== Legacy ==
The touch-oriented Metro design language introduced as part of Windows 8, released in 2012, shared a large number of common goals with the Neptune project, including the unimplemented Activity Centers' focus on typography as well as dedicated full-screen applications for common tasks. In addition, Windows 8 introduced hybrid boot, a functionality that takes advantage of hibernation to capture the initial states of necessary system applications and boot drivers, largely similar in principle to the Boot Accelerator feature that would have been included as part of Neptune.

== See also ==
- List of Microsoft codenames
- Development of Windows XP
