= Active Platform =

Web application development playform

The Active Platform was the name of a development platform released by Microsoft in the 90s for creating web applications and delivering them to a PC desktop environment. The platform consisted of three parts: ActiveDesktop, which would use push technology to deliver the web applications to the desktop; ActiveServer, which would provide server side scripting; and ActiveX, a set of technologies created to allow software components on different machines to communicate with each other using COM and OLE.

== History ==
The Active Platform strategy started to take shape after the cancellation of another Microsoft project, Blackbird, and as challenges were developing from Microsoft's competitors. Blackbird promised to make web applications function more like those users were accustomed to on the desktop, by using distributed OLE (Object Linking and Embedding) rather than HTML markup. The project was soon scrapped, after Microsoft realized that there were performance problems and it became clear that HTML was gaining in popularity. Meanwhile, Netscape, Sun, Oracle and IBM (referred to as the "Gang of Four") proposed turning Java into a similar type of distributed object platform that would form the basis of an Internet OS which could compete with Windows. Such an OS would rely on web applications that were run through a browser and constructed using Java software components.

In response, Microsoft announced the Active Platform at their SiteBuilder conference in October 1996. ActiveDesktop at first was promised by Microsoft to run on any operating system, but only appeared in Windows, first through the Internet Explorer 4.0 release, and later in Windows 98. Active Server was based on IIS 3.0 and included Active Server Pages, the Distributed Component Object Model (DCOM), Microsoft Transaction Server, and a new message queuing-based middleware. ActiveX was based on a number of technologies Microsoft had already developed for Windows. ActiveX controls were OLE based controls that could be embedded in web pages, applications, and on the desktop.

ActiveX became strongly criticized for security problems, and Microsoft later abandoned further development in favor of the .NET Framework. ActiveDesktop was never widely used and disappeared in newer versions of Windows, the concept only later being readopted in the Windows Sidebar, which was added as a response to the Dashboard feature in Apple's OS X. ActiveServer was later harmonized with the .NET platform and a revamped version of ASP became known as ASP.NET.

The Active Platform strategy became the center of a United States anti-trust suit against Microsoft.
