= Local Security Authority Subsystem Service =

Computer operating system component

Local Security Authority Subsystem Service (LSASS) is a process in Microsoft Windows operating systems that is responsible for enforcing the security policy on the system. It verifies users logging on to a Windows computer or server, handles password changes, and creates access tokens. It also writes to the Windows Security Log.

Forcible termination of lsass.exe will result in the system losing access to any account, including NT AUTHORITY, starting a one-minute timer that after it runs out the system restarts. Under Windows XP the shutdown timer can be stopped with "shutdown -a" which will result in many features of the system that use the RPC server (user profile (management), sysdm.cpl, etc.) being unusable, often permission errors occur even when logged in with an account that has administrative permissions, when logging off, clicking switch user, or locking the machine, either a black screen appears or logging in is not possible again, or logging off is impossible at all, the machine often needs to be reset as a normal shutdown is not possible anymore after lsass.exe has been terminated. Because lsass.exe is a crucial system file, its name is often faked by malware. The lsass.exe file used by Windows is located in the directory %WINDIR%\System32, and the description of the file is Local Security Authority Process. If it is running from any other location, that lsass.exe is most likely a virus, spyware, trojan or worm. Due to the way some systems display fonts, malicious developers may name the file something like Isass.exe (uppercase "i" instead of a lowercase "L") in efforts to trick users into installing or executing a malicious file instead of the trusted system file. The Sasser worm spreads by exploiting a buffer overflow in the LSASS on Windows XP and Windows 2000 operating systems.
