= Blackbird (online platform) =

Blackbird was the codename for an online content authoring platform developed by Microsoft in the mid-90s. Intended to be the online publishing tool for the first version of MSN (The Microsoft Network), "Blackbird" was born of a Microsoft acquisition of Daily Planet Software, and the tool was first conceived prior to the advent of the Internet and Web as we know it today. At the time, AOL and CompuServe were the primary online venues, and the introduction of the Web to mass consumers was about to begin, even as low-bandwidth, dialup connections dominated. "Blackbird" was based on the concept of an object-based backend file system in Microsoft Data Centers (Microsoft "Cairo"/NT), a low-bandwidth-streaming rendering client with page-based layout (similar to Aldus PageMaker but based on online streaming) and embedded interactive client-side ActiveX objects (then OLE). Fundamentally, it was based on the SGML standard (the direct ancestor of HTML) for client-side layout. It became a Microsoft-promoted alternative to HTML for a brief time, just as the commercial Internet and Web Browser were born. But with scripting capability for HTML yet to be demonstrated, it was to be a means to serve dynamic, media-rich applications and documents that contained processing logic, similar to what a user would experience in a desktop environment. Pages in a "Blackbird application" would be able to contain video, audio, graphs, and other OLE based document formats without the need of plug-ins.

The technology had already been demonstrated in Microsoft's dial-up service at the time, MSN, and plans were in progress to port it to Internet use over a dedicated protocol, but work on the platform was cancelled due to the overwhelming move to the HTML/WWW/Internet standards commercialized and consuming the computing world, for example by Netscape at the time, and the need for backend, server-side scripting technologies which were lacking. Performance problems also plagued the pre-releases under beta testing.

In 1995, Microsoft hence refocused its efforts for online development around the Web/HTML standards, including ASP and ActiveX, and the "Blackbird" designer was refashioned into Visual InterDev. As such, the technology, integrated into the first version of Visual Studio (VS 97) as its now Web-standards based core and trademarked as "Microsoft Visual Studio" is an ancestor to one of the leading Web development tools dating from the commercial birth of the Web, to today.

Prior to this, the codename was derived from a Cold War era stealth spy plane, the Lockheed SR-71 Blackbird.

== Core technology ==
The centerpiece of Blackbird was OLE, the container format already in use in Windows applications to allow objects and documents to communicate with each other and share information. Blackbird documents would be stored in what was called Blackbird Data Format (BDF), a structured format based on OLE storage. An SGML-based markup language, Blackbird Markup Language (BML), was also created to help automate the creation of documents, though documents based on markup would be processed into the native data format to be used as OLE objects, so would suffer performance disadvantages. To give developers more flexibility, Microsoft planned to include a utility that would allow conversion between BDF and BML, as well as HTML, in any direction.

Additionally, there would be an application resource installer that packaged custom fonts, OLE controls, and other resource files for a Blackbird application. The package would download when a user activated the application for the first time, or otherwise to update the package already on a user's system. Microsoft also advertised that Blackbird would take advantage of features within Windows 95 like shortcuts, and would allow the user to automatically schedule the delivery of content.

There were three components to the platform — an authoring system called the Blackbird Designer, a visual drag-and drop environment similar to that included with Visual Basic; the Blackbird Server, which ran on Windows NT; and the Blackbird Client, a runtime module to lets users access and run Blackbird applications. URLs for Blackbird applications were OLE monikers.

Microsoft argued that Blackbird development would be cross-platform, since OLE support had already existed on Macintosh and there was work in progress on porting it to Unix systems. To guarantee security, the company planned to act as a certifying authority for OLE controls (OCXs), and encourage third parties to be certifying authorities.

== Project history ==
Blackbird was announced in March 1995 as part of the upcoming Microsoft Network, and by August, it had been clear that Microsoft intended it to run more widely over Internet protocols. The technology was later demonstrated on MSN and Microsoft released a beta version of the developer tools, but by the end of 1996, when plans for a new version were announced, the designer then renamed to "Internet Studio", they disclosed they would not use the proprietary Blackbird file formats, but rather, standard HTML. It soon became clear the original project was effectively scrapped, and the designer later became Visual InterDev, a general web content creation tool for creating HTML and developing server pages using ASP, and the key Web technology glue for the first version of Visual Studio, Visual Studio 97. Visual InterDev, as the key Web ingredient to Visual Studio, was the Internet advent of Microsoft Web development tools, binding the previously mass-successful products Visual Basic and Visual C++ to the Internet. Also included was the ability to author ActiveX controls — OLE controls that could be embedded in HTML pages through a plug-in. These would be key parts to Microsoft's Active Platform strategy.

It was later revealed that Blackbird had severe performance problems because of an over-complex architecture which made excessive use of multi-threading. When prototypes of the Trident HTML layout engine were completed, and it was shown that the goals of complex layout in Blackbird could be achieved in HTML at better performance, it led to executives to rethink the project.

Mark Anders, a former head of the IIS team at Microsoft, has cited Blackbird as an example of how Microsoft has a tendency to over-complicate software and compared it to other projects like Longhorn.

== Reference in antitrust case ==
Blackbird was later referenced in the United States antitrust suit against Microsoft. It was argued by the prosecution that Netscape's efforts to transform their web suite into an "Internet OS" was seen as competition to their plans for a proprietary Internet, and this led them to adopt an aggressive Internet strategy. Netscape in many documents cited by the prosecution was described as competition to Windows. However, it has been pointed out that Netscape planned to compete not only against any possible Internet platform from Microsoft but against Windows as an OS in itself.

== See also ==
- Microsoft codenames
- The Microsoft Network
- Active Platform
