= Steel thread =

Software engineering technique

A steel thread is a software engineering technique that helps define the most important paths through a computer system. It's a way to build a software system by weaving together thin slices of functionality, called threads, that implement key use cases. In this way fully functional software is built up, allowing earlier testing of links and capacities and acting as an early proof of concept.

This was based on the bridge building technique where a steel thread would be thrown from one side of the valley to the other and when secured would be used to move progressively greater loads starting perhaps with a beam, each load supporting further loads. Within software engineering the practice is to first build a minimal system that is less than a Minimum Viable Product that only covers one core piece of functionality but that does it end to end. After this another complete piece of functionality is added until a Minimum Viable Product is built.
