= Web application =

Application that uses a web browser as a client

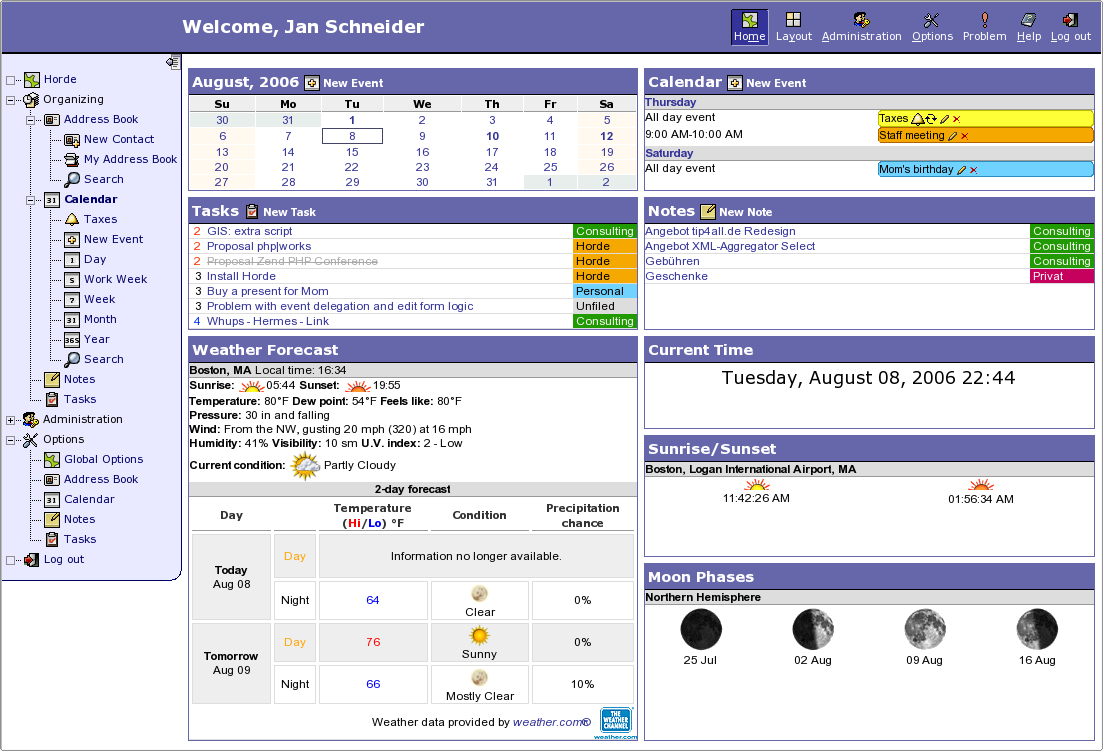
Screenshot from 2007 of Horde, a groupware and open-source web application

A web application (or web app) is application software that is created with web technologies and runs via a web browser. Web applications emerged during the late 1990s and allowed the server to dynamically build a response to a request, in contrast to static web pages.

Web applications are commonly distributed via a web server. There are several different tier systems that web applications use to communicate between the web browsers, the client interface, and server data. Each system has its own uses as they function in different ways. However, there are many security risks that developers must be aware of during development; proper measures to protect user data are vital.

Web applications are often constructed with the use of a web application framework. Single-page applications (SPAs) and progressive web apps (PWAs) are two architectural approaches to creating web applications that provide a user experience similar to native apps, including features such as smooth navigation, offline support, and faster interactions.

Web applications are often fully hosted on remote cloud services, can require a constant connection to them, and can replace conventional desktop applications for operating systems such as Microsoft Windows, thus facilitating the operation of software as a service as it grants the developer the power to tightly control billing based on use of the remote services as well as vendor lock-in by hosting data remotely. Modern browsers such as Chrome offer sandboxing for every browser tab which improves security and restricts access to local resources. No software installation is required as the app runs within the browser, which reduces the need for managing software installations. With the use of remote cloud services, customers do not need to manage servers, since that can be left to the developer and the cloud service, and can use the software with a relatively low power, low-resource PC such as a thin client. The source code of the application can stay the same across operating systems and devices of users with the use of responsive web design, since it only needs to be compatible with web browsers which adhere to web standards, making the code highly portable and saving on development time. Numerous JavaScript frameworks and CSS frameworks facilitate development.

== History ==
The concept of a "web application" was first introduced in the Java language in the Servlet Specification version 2.2, which was released in 1999. At that time, both JavaScript and XML had already been developed, but the XMLHttpRequest object had only been recently introduced on Internet Explorer 5 as an ActiveX object. Beginning around the early 2000s, applications such as "Myspace (2003), Gmail (2004), Digg (2004), [and] Google Maps (2005)," started to make their client sides more and more interactive. A web page script is able to contact the server for storing and retrieving data without downloading an entire web page. The practice became known as Ajax in 2005. Eventually this was replaced by web APIs using JSON, accessed via JavaScript asynchronously on the client side.

In earlier computing models like client-server, the processing load for the application was shared between code on the server and code installed on each client locally. In other words, an application had its own pre-compiled client program which served as its user interface and had to be separately installed on each user's personal computer. An upgrade to the server-side code of the application would typically also require an upgrade to the client-side code installed on each user workstation, adding to the support cost and decreasing productivity. Additionally, both the client and server components of the application were bound tightly to a particular computer architecture and operating system, which made porting them to other systems prohibitively expensive for all but the largest applications.

Later, in 1995, Netscape introduced the client-side scripting language called JavaScript, which allowed programmers to add dynamic elements to the user interface that ran on the client side. Essentially, instead of sending data to the server in order to generate an entire web page, the embedded scripts of the downloaded page can perform various tasks, such as input validation or showing/hiding parts of the page.

"Progressive web apps", the term coined by designer Frances Berriman and Google Chrome engineer Alex Russell in 2015, refers to apps taking advantage of new features supported by modern browsers, which initially run inside a web browser tab but can later run completely offline and can be launched without entering the app URL in the browser.

== Structure ==
Traditional PC applications are typically single-tiered, residing solely on the client machine. In contrast, web applications inherently facilitate a multi-tiered architecture. Though many variations are possible, the most common structure is the three-tiered application. In its most common form, the three tiers are called presentation, application, and storage. The first tier, presentation, refers to a web browser itself. The second tier refers to any engine using dynamic web content technology (such as ASP, CGI, ColdFusion, Dart, JSP/Java, Node.js, PHP, Python or Ruby on Rails). The third tier refers to a database that stores data and determines the structure of a user interface. Essentially, when using the three-tiered system, the web browser sends requests to the engine, which then services them by making queries and updates against the database, and generates a user interface.

The 3-tier solution may fall short when dealing with more complex applications and may need to be replaced with the n-tiered approach; the greatest benefit of which is how business logic (which resides on the application tier) is broken down into a more fine-grained model. Another benefit would be to add an integration tier, which separates the data tier and provides an easy-to-use interface to access the data. For example, the client data would be accessed by calling a "list_clients()" function instead of making an SQL query directly against the client table on the database. This allows the underlying database to be replaced without making any change to the other tiers.

There are some who view a web application as a two-tier architecture. This can be a "smart" client that performs all the work and queries a "dumb" server, or a "dumb" client that relies on a "smart" server. The client would handle the presentation tier, the server would have the database (storage tier), and the business logic (application tier) would be on one of them or on both. While this increases the scalability of the applications and separates the display and the database, it still does not allow for true specialization of layers, so most applications will outgrow this model.

== Security ==
Security breaches on these kinds of applications are a major concern because it can involve both enterprise information and private customer data. Protecting these assets is an important part of any web application, and there are some key operational areas that must be included in the development process. This includes processes for authentication, authorization, asset handling, input, and logging and auditing. Building security into the applications from the beginning is sometimes more effective and less disruptive in the long run.

== Development ==
Writing web applications is simplified with the use of web application frameworks. These frameworks facilitate rapid application development by allowing a development team to focus on the parts of their application which are unique to their goals without having to resolve common development issues such as user management.

In addition, there is potential for the development of applications on Internet operating systems, although currently there are not many viable platforms that fit this model.

== See also ==
- Web API
- Software as a service (SaaS)
- Web 2.0
- Web engineering
- Web GIS
- Web services
- Web sciences
- Web widget
