= Visual InterDev =

Discontinued Microsoft web development environment

Microsoft Visual InterDev
- Developer: Microsoft
- Release: March 1997
- Final release: 6.0 / 1998
- Operating system: Microsoft Windows
- Type: Integrated development environment
- License: Proprietary

Microsoft Visual InterDev was an integrated development environment (IDE) developed by Microsoft for creating and managing dynamic, data-driven websites and web applications. It was designed primarily for development with Active Server Pages (ASP) and Internet Information Services (IIS), while also providing tools for HTML authoring, database access, server-side scripting, site management and team development.

The first version of Visual InterDev was released in March 1997 and was included in Visual Studio 97. A substantially redesigned Visual InterDev 6.0 followed in 1998 as part of Visual Studio 6.0.

Visual InterDev was eventually superseded by Microsoft's web-development tools in Visual Studio .NET and by the ASP.NET development model. Microsoft documentation subsequently described Visual InterDev 6.0 functionality as having been integrated into Visual Studio .NET.

== History ==
=== Origins and development ===
Development of Visual InterDev began during Microsoft's mid-1990s effort to provide development tools for the rapidly expanding World Wide Web. According to Microsoft software architect Blake Cook, who described himself as the architect of Visual InterDev, the project began in 1995 after Microsoft redirected development resources toward Web technologies.

Cook's group had previously worked within the Microsoft Access organization on component-based forms and database-design technology. Microsoft combined this work with a second group developing tools for the company's Blackbird project. The resulting team developed what became Visual InterDev.

The original product was constructed using the development environment associated with Visual C++ 5.0. Cook later explained that HTML-design and database components were re-hosted inside that environment while Microsoft pursued a broader goal of creating a common IDE architecture for its programming tools.

Microsoft announced widespread beta availability of Visual InterDev on 9 December 1996. At the time, the company described the product as combining an integrated visual environment with database-development, site-management and content-editing tools.

=== Visual InterDev 1.0 ===
Visual InterDev 1.0 shipped in March 1997 as one of the products included with Visual Studio 97. Microsoft characterized it as a system for building and managing data-driven Web applications whose generated HTML could be viewed across browsers and operating systems.

The product was closely associated with Microsoft's emerging server-side Web platform. It supported Active Server Pages, which executed on IIS, and provided facilities for combining HTML with server-side scripting and database access.

Contemporary author Blake Cook later recalled that the product, initially encountered under the name Internet Studio, was particularly oriented toward connecting websites with databases.

In October 1997 Microsoft released the Visual InterDev Web Solutions Kit, containing a 30-day trial of the development environment, tutorials, sample applications and third-party components. Microsoft reported at the time that more than 200,000 professional developers were using Visual InterDev, citing an August 1997 study by Market Decisions Corporation.

=== Visual InterDev 6.0 ===
Visual InterDev 6.0 was developed for Visual Studio 6.0 and represented a major redesign of the product. Microsoft publicly demonstrated pre-release versions during 1998, and Visual Studio 6.0 was officially launched in September of that year.

Writing retrospectively in 2017, Blake Cook described Visual InterDev 6.0 as having been rearchitected from the ground up and emphasized its expanded visual data-access capabilities.

The 6.0 generation was also important to Microsoft's broader IDE architecture. Cook stated that during the Visual Studio 6.0 development cycle Microsoft created a new COM-based shell intended to permit independently developed components to plug into a common environment. Visual InterDev and Visual J++ were the first two Microsoft development products incorporated into this new IDE architecture.

That architecture became a step toward Microsoft's eventual goal of a unified development environment, which Cook said was achieved with Visual Studio .NET in 2002.

== Features ==
=== Integrated Web development ===
Visual InterDev was intended to bring multiple stages of Web application development into a single workspace. Microsoft's original product announcement described an environment containing visual development, database tools, site management and content-editing functionality.

Developers could work with HTML pages and server-side ASP applications while managing the files and resources associated with a website. The environment was intended for both Internet and corporate intranet development.

=== Active Server Pages ===
Visual InterDev was closely integrated with Active Server Pages, Microsoft's server-side scripting technology for IIS. ASP applications could combine HTML with server-side scripts and reusable components to generate dynamic pages.

The development framework provided support for application state, server-side scripting and open database access. Microsoft promoted Visual InterDev as a way to create ASP applications while retaining ordinary HTML output for the client browser.

=== Database development ===
Database connectivity was one of Visual InterDev's central features. The first release included integrated database-development tools and could work with databases supporting ODBC.

Microsoft's tooling incorporated ActiveX Data Objects (ADO), database wizards and design-time controls capable of generating portions of the HTML and server-side scripting required for database-backed forms.

Visual InterDev 6.0 expanded the visual approach to data-bound Web applications. Contemporary accounts highlighted drag-and-drop and visual manipulation of recordsets as important additions to the redesigned release.

=== Team development and deployment ===
The product supported collaborative Web development. Microsoft promoted interoperability with FrontPage 97 and integration with Visual SourceSafe 5.0 for revision tracking and file locking.

Visual InterDev was also designed to work alongside COM components and business objects developed using other Microsoft programming tools, including Visual Basic, Visual C++, Visual J++ and Visual FoxPro.

== Relationship to Visual Studio ==
Diagram of editions in the later Microsoft Visual Studio product family. Visual InterDev was one of the Web-development products incorporated into the early Visual Studio suites.

Visual InterDev was significant in the evolution of Microsoft's integrated development environment architecture. Visual Studio 97 bundled Visual InterDev with Visual Basic, Visual C++, Visual J++, and Visual FoxPro, although the products did not yet all operate inside a single common IDE.

According to Cook, Microsoft's long-term objective was to create a common, extensible shell capable of hosting multiple languages and development tools. Work associated with Visual InterDev contributed to that architecture during both the Visual Studio 97 and Visual Studio 6.0 development cycles.

The Visual Studio 6.0-era shell adopted a COM-based architecture intended to allow separately built components to coexist without requiring the tightly coupled source-code dependencies of Microsoft's earlier development environments.

Microsoft ultimately reached the single-shell model with Visual Studio .NET in 2002.

== Succession and legacy ==
Visual Studio branding from 2017. Visual InterDev had been superseded long before this version, but its Web-development functions became part of the wider Visual Studio environment.

Visual InterDev did not continue as a separately branded product after version 6.0. Microsoft's subsequent development environment consolidated Web application development into Visual Studio .NET, while ASP.NET replaced classic ASP as Microsoft's principal new Web application framework.

Microsoft documentation explicitly notes that Visual InterDev 6.0 features were integrated into Visual Studio .NET. The Visual Studio .NET debugging environment also retained concepts familiar to Visual InterDev 6.0 users, although Microsoft moved toward a unified debugger and designer interface for different application and language types.

Visual InterDev is therefore principally associated with Microsoft's transition during the late 1990s from separate language-specific development products toward the integrated and extensible Visual Studio environment used in later releases.

== See also ==
Active Server Pages

ASP.NET

Internet Information Services

Microsoft Visual Studio

Microsoft FrontPage

Microsoft Visual SourceSafe

Visual J++
