= Winzapper =

Winzapper is a freeware utility / hacking tool used to delete events from the Microsoft Windows NT 4.0 and Windows 2000 Security Log. It was developed by Arne Vidstrom as a proof-of-concept tool, demonstrating that once the Administrator account has been compromised, event logs are no longer reliable. According to Hacking Exposed: Windows Server 2003, Winzapper works with Windows NT/2000/2003.

Prior to Winzapper's creation, Administrators already had the ability to clear the Security log either through the Event Viewer or through third-party tools such as Clearlogs. However, Windows lacked any built-in method of selectively deleting events from the Security Log. An unexpected clearing of the log would likely be a red flag to system administrators that an intrusion had occurred. Winzapper would allow a hacker to hide the intrusion by deleting only those log events relevant to the attack. Winzapper, as publicly released, lacked the ability to be run remotely without the use of a tool such as Terminal Services. However, according to Arne Vidstrom, it could easily be modified for remote operation.

There is also an unrelated trojan horse by the same name.

== Countermeasures ==
Winzapper creates a backup security log, "dummy.dat," at %systemroot%\system32\config. This file may be undeleted after an attack to recover the original log. Conceivably, however, a savvy user might copy a sufficiently large file over the dummy.dat file and thus irretrievably overwrite it. Winzapper causes the Event Viewer to become unusable until after a reboot, so an unexpected reboot may be a clue that Winzapper has recently been used. Another potential clue to a Winzapper-based attempt would be corruption of the Security Log (requiring it to be cleared), since there is always a small risk that Winzapper will do this.

According to WindowsNetworking.com, "One way to prevent rogue admins from using this tool on your servers is to implement a Software Restriction Policy using Group Policy that prevents the WinZapper executable from running".
