= Identity Governance Framework =

The Identity Governance Framework was a project of the Liberty Alliance for standards to help enterprises determine and control how identity information is used, stored, and propagated using protocols such as LDAP, SAML, and WS-Trust and ID-WSF.

== Purpose ==
The Identity Governance Framework (IGF) enables organizations to define policies that regulate and control the exchange of identity information between application systems, both internally and with external partners. Identity information may include things like names, addresses, social security numbers or other information that would be otherwise considered related to an individual's identity.

The policy information is both useful to privacy auditors for assessing the use of identity information in applications and to policy enforcement systems for ensuring that appropriate use of identity information takes place.

== History ==
IGF was originally announced by Oracle in November, 2006 as a joint initiative between CA, HP, Layer 7 Technologies, Novell, Oracle, Ping Identity, Securent, and Sun Microsystems.

In February 2007, the initiative was transferred to the Liberty Alliance to take the draft proposal forward and fully develop the standard.

In July 2007, Liberty announced completion of the Market Requirements Use Case documentation.

In June 2008, Liberty Alliance announced publication of draft specifications for CARML and Privacy Constraints.

In November 2008, Project Aristotle announced release 1.0 of the ArisID API implementing the draft specifications for IGF. See project FAQ for more information.

In November 2009, Liberty Alliance published final specifications of IGF components CARML (Client Attribute Requirements Markup Language) and IGF Privacy Constraints.

In December 2009, Project Aristotle published ArisID, an implementation of IGF 1.0 release 1.1.

Liberty Alliance published final specifications of IGF components CARML (Client Attribute Requirements Markup Language) and IGF Privacy Constraints in the fall of 2009. Ongoing standards work is now being handled by the Kantara Initiative, LSM Working Group

An implementation of CARML and IGF Privacy Constraints was available through Project Aristotle, an Apache 2.0 Licensed open source project. Release 1.1 was released in December 2009.
