= Windows Odyssey =

Codename for a version of Microsoft Windows

Odyssey
- Version of the Windows NT operating system
- Developer: Microsoft
- Working state: Historic, never released
- Marketing target: Business
- Kernel type: Windows NT
- License: Non-disclosure agreement

Support status
- Cancelled

Odyssey (also known as NT6) was the codename for a version of Microsoft Windows that was intended to succeed Windows 2000. It was cancelled sometime in 2000 and was merged with Neptune to create Windows XP.

== Development ==
Development of Odyssey began alongside the consumer-based Neptune project in 1999 and was based on the Windows 2000 codebase. Features planned for Odyssey were the new Activity Centers as well as a new user interface. The version number of Odyssey is unknown, with some unverified sources claiming it as NT 6.0 or NT 5.5.

Due to high hardware requirements and because Odyssey and Neptune were built on the same codebase, Microsoft combined them to form a new product codenamed Whistler, for efficiency. No builds or versions of Odyssey were ever leaked or released by Microsoft as the product never left the planning stage.

Confidential documents from the Comes vs. Microsoft case do state that Odyssey was indeed under development.

== See also ==
- List of Microsoft codenames
