= Internet OS =

An Internet operating system, or Internet OS, is any type of operating system designed to run all of its applications and services through an Internet client, generally a web browser. The advantages of such an OS would be that it would run on a thin client, allowing cheaper, more easily manageable computer systems; it would require all applications to be designed on cross-platform, open standards; and would not tie a user's applications, documents, and preferences to a single computer, but rather place them in the Internet cloud. The Internet OS has also been promoted as the perfect type of platform for software as a service.

== History ==
Talk of an Internet OS began to surface in 1995 as the browser war started heating up between Microsoft and Netscape.

In response to the limited capabilities of HTML at the time, Microsoft began developing an online content authoring platform that would be based on distributed OLE (Object Linking and Embedding) which it codenamed Blackbird. Using OLE, applications put on the web would contain their own processing logic, so would act similar to applications in a typical desktop environment. Immediately, there were concerns that this would tie the web to proprietary Microsoft technology that wouldn't be guaranteed to run across different systems.

As a challenge, Marc Andreessen of Netscape announced a set of new products that would help transform their browser into what he called an "Internet OS" that would provide the tools and programming interfaces for a new generation of Internet-based applications. The so-called "Internet OS" would still run on top of a regular OS – being based around Netscape Navigator – but he dismissed desktop operating systems like Windows as simply "bag[s] of drivers", reiterating that the goal would be to "turn Windows into a mundane collection of not entirely debugged device drivers".

Andreessen explained that the newest versions of Navigator were not just web browsers, but suites of Internet applications, including programs for mail, FTP, news, and more, and would come with viewers for a variety of document types, like Adobe Acrobat, Apple QuickTime, and Sun Java applets, which would give it programming interfaces and publishing tools for developers. Netscape also would continue to sell its server software, and Java applets would run cross-platform on both its clients and its servers, and as a scripting language in the form of JavaScript. They would also provide facilities for backend transaction processing, elaborating the client/server model with navigating clients and application servers and database servers. He pointed out – because of the broad capabilities that all of this gave their browser – the only difference technically between Netscape Navigator and a traditional operating system is that Navigator didn't include device drivers.

Technical problems with Blackbird, the growth of the web, and what they saw as competitive statements from Netscape, soon led Microsoft to rethink their strategy and they began to position OLE as a primary tool within Netscape's proposed ecosystem. OLE would now be embeddable in web pages using an ActiveX plug-in, and would be easily integrated on the server side using ASP (Active Server Pages) development.

=== The "Gang of Five" and the NC ===
Opposition in the industry to Microsoft began to grow, as did the concept of an "Internet OS", and this led to the formation of an alliance around developing Java as an alternative to Windows – the chief partners being Netscape, Sun, Oracle, and IBM. These companies were informally referred to in the industry press as the "Gang of Four". Novell later joined the alliance, leading it to be called the "Gang of Five".

In May 1997, the group published a position paper which discussed integration of software component models within CORBA – a commonly used architecture allowing computer applications from different vendors running on different systems to work together over networks. From this, they then issued several RFPs (Request for Proposals) to the Object Management Group (OMG), the standards body responsible for managing CORBA, meant to help integrate different aspects of Java. The proposals included support for JavaBeans – the serialized, component architecture of Java – and for JavaScript. In what was called the "Java-tization of CORBA", the group was positioning Java to be a distributed object architecture, similar to what Microsoft had intended with OLE in Blackbird. OLE would only exist as a second-class technology that would interface through CORBA using JavaBeans.

The group also promoted the idea of a JavaOS – a minimal, Java-based operating system – which would in turn run Netscape's web browser, and through the browser run JavaBeans components. This would be the front for a new ecosystem based on open standards; first, HTML in the web browser; and second, Java, which they hoped would become widely adopted through CORBA. JavaOS would be hosted on a Network Computer (or NC), a concept long advocated by Oracle. The NC would be a thin client designed only for Internet use, leaving it to access applications and documents stored entirely online. Oracle saw its role as providing tools for the server layer, where network-hosted applications would be provided through the Network Application Server, which in turn would make use of both Oracle7 relationship database management system and the Oracle Web Server. Oracle also outlined what was referred to as the Network Computing Architecture (NCA), which would separate presentation, application and data access logic into Java applets or NCA cartridges.

Microsoft and Intel in response to this challenge put forward a standard for a competing model called the NetPC, a diskless PC that would be primarily adapted to web browser use and would run a simplified version of Windows 95, codenamed Pegasus. Later down the road, this idea evolved into the Netbook. Microsoft publicly criticized the idea of an Internet OS, and instead argued that the traditional desktop OS should be Internet-enabled, the beginning of the idea for Active Platform, an Internet strategy that culminated later in the release of Windows 98. This strategy, which involved tightly bundling Internet Explorer in Windows, became the center of a United States antitrust suit against Microsoft. All of the Gang of Five – Netscape, Sun, IBM, Oracle, and Novell – were involved in lobbying for antitrust action against Microsoft.

By 1998, the Java alliance started to fall apart. Oracle continued developing server-side Java databases but had given up the idea of the network computer and Netscape had given up on their Java browser efforts, instead aiming to position themselves as an Internet portal. Pressure from investors was given the blame.

=== ChromeOS and ChromiumOS ===
Google revived the idea of the Internet OS in 2009 with the development of ChromeOS, a Linux-based operating system designed to work exclusively with AJAX-based web applications. The operating system was designed to look and operate like the Chrome web browser and be sold on laptops developed with partners, called Chromebooks. They also promoted G Suite, their suite of web applications, as an alternative to traditional desktop software such as Microsoft Office.

Google has tried to address standard criticisms of the Internet OS concept with its development projects. Google Native Client allows a browser to run Intel x86 native code in a sandbox, so that more complex programs could run that more fully take advantage of a system's hardware. Google Gears was also created to allow offline access of online applications, although this is being deprecated in favour of web storage, a model in the process of standardization by the World Wide Web Consortium (W3C).

ChromiumOS is the development version of ChromeOS, but before ChromeOS was available, ChromiumOS's principal user interface was the Chromium web browser, which is fully free and open-source, rather than the commercial Google Chrome web browser. As such ChromiumOS does not ship with any of Google's branding and proprietary cloud services preinstalled.

== See also ==
- Kiosk software
- Cloud computing
- DR-WebSpyder
