= Microsoft .NET strategy =

Marketing plan

The Microsoft .NET strategy is a marketing plan that Microsoft followed in the early 2000s. Steve Ballmer described it as the company's "most ambitious undertaking since Internet Strategy Day in 1995". In support of this strategy, between 2000 and 2002, Microsoft released ".NET" branded updates to its works, including Visual Studio .NET, Visual Basic .NET, .NET Passport, .NET My Services, .NET Framework, ASP.NET and ADO.NET. A Windows .NET Server was also announced. Microsoft had plans to include Microsoft SQL Server, Microsoft Exchange Server and MSN into this strategy.

By 2003, however, the .NET strategy had dwindled into a failed branding campaign because the brand had failed to articulate what Microsoft had in mind in the first place. As such, Windows .NET Server was released under the title of Windows Server 2003. Since then, Visual Studio and .NET Passport have been stripped of ".NET" in their brandings. However, Microsoft and the rest of the computing industry use ".NET" to indicate close association with .NET Framework, e.g. .NET Compiler Platform, .NET Foundation and .NET Reflector.
