= .NET My Services =

Discontinued Microsoft product

Microsoft HailStorm
- A sample toast notification utilizing .NET Alerts to provide information about traffic conditions.
- Owner: Microsoft
- Commercial: Yes
- Launched: Abandoned

.NET My Services (codenamed Hailstorm) is an abandoned collection of XML-based Web services by Microsoft for storing and retrieving information. NET My Services was announced on March 19, 2001, as part of Microsoft's .NET initiative and was intended to rely on what was then known as a Microsoft Passport, a single sign-in web service now referred to as a Microsoft account.

.NET My Services was a platform intended to facilitate the storage and retrieval of user-related information, such as contacts, calendar information, and e-mail messages, by allowing it to be accessed from a centralized repository across various applications and device types, including traditional desktop PCs, and mobile devices such as laptops, mobile phones, PDAs, and tablet PCs; access to this stored information would be based solely on user discretion. The technology would rely on a subscription-based business model.

Although the technology required a Microsoft Passport, it was based on cross-platform, open standard web services, including SOAP, UDDI, and WS-Discovery, which enabled interoperability with compatible systems without requiring Microsoft Windows.

After .NET My Services was announced on March 19, 2001, Microsoft intended for it to reach broad developer availability at that year's Professional Developers Conference, with a subsequent end-user release scheduled for 2002. However, due to industry concerns related to anti-competitive behavior and end-user privacy, the company ultimately abandoned the initiative before it could fully materialize.

== See also ==
- Microsoft Office XP
- Smart tags
- Windows Communication Foundation
- WinFS
