= Windows Admin Center =

System administration software

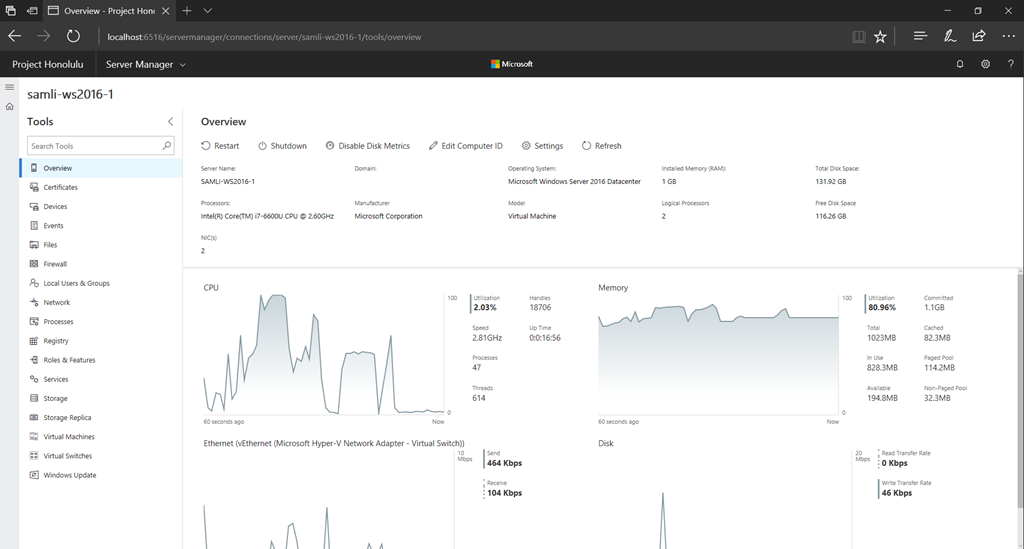
- Web-based graphical interface to manage Windows Server infrastructure offered by Microsoft
- Developer: Microsoft
- Release: April 12, 2018; 8 years ago
- Stable release: 2606 / July 9, 2026; 8 days ago
- Operating system: Windows Server 2012 or later, Windows 10 or later
- Platform: x64
- Size: 80 MB
- Type: Systems management
- License: Freeware
- Website: docs.microsoft.com/en-us/windows-server/manage/windows-admin-center/overview

Windows Admin Center (code-named Project Honolulu) is a web program released by Microsoft on April 12, 2018 as an evolution of the Windows Server graphical user interface (GUI). Officially launched in public preview under the code name Project Honolulu at the Microsoft Ignite 2017 conference in Orlando, Florida, Windows Admin Center is meant to be a GUI-focused replacement for the management of Windows servers, Windows server clusters, and PCs. The idea behind the project was to simplify the management of servers by placing the majority of frequently referenced tools used by system administrators in one place. The project left preview on April 12, 2018 and was named Windows Admin Center.

== Features ==
A list of features that are offered from this web based administration tool are as follows, and expected to grow with the ability for plugins and 3rd party extensions:

- Overview
- Azure hybrid services
- Azure Backup
- Azure File Sync
- Azure Monitor
- Azure Security Center
- Certificates
- Devices
- Events
- Files
- Firewall
- Installed apps
- Local users & groups
- Network
- PowerShell
- Processes
- Registry
- Remote Desktop
- Roles & features
- Scheduled tasks
- Services
- Storage
- Storage replica
- Updates
- Virtual Machines
- Virtual Switches
- Settings (Note: Not to be confused another Settings page that pertains Windows Admin Center itself. This Settings page configures the target computer.)

In addition, Windows Admin Center also offers Hyper Converged Cluster Management.

There are a few features like Storage Replica which do not have any alternative GUI at the moment and are still command line based.

== Server compatibility ==
While designed to manage Windows Server 2012 and later, Windows Admin Center can also manage Windows 10, albeit with fewer tools. In order to manage Windows Server 2012 or 2012 R2, the Windows Management Framework (WMF) version 5.1 or higher must be installed. Additionally, Windows Server 2008 R2 can be managed with the installation of Windows Management Framework version 5.1 or higher, albeit with limited functionality.

== Client compatibility and installation ==
Windows Admin Center can be installed on Windows 10, Windows Server 2016, or later operating systems. Installing Windows Admin Center requires an ~80MB Microsoft Installer Package (MSI). The installer will ask for a port to serve the website on, as well as the ability to use or generate a self-signed SSL certificate.

Once installed, Windows Admin Center can be accessed over the web, and servers can be managed upon their addition. Presently, Windows Admin Center only supports Microsoft Edge and Google Chrome.

== Simplified management ==
Windows Admin Center was brought into existence because "IT admins have repeatedly told us that PowerShell is necessary but not sufficient, and that Windows Server ease-of-use is still largely dependent on GUI Tools for core scenarios and new capabilities." Windows Admin Center builds off of the Microsoft Management Console introduced in Windows 2000. It takes the most used management utilities (such as the Event Viewer, Roles and Features, Hyper-V management, Windows Firewall, and Registry editor) and puts them into a user-friendly, web-based application.
