= System Center Service Manager =

Incident and Ticketing Software by Microsoft

- Developer: Microsoft
- Stable release: 2016 / October 2016
- Operating system: Microsoft Windows
- Platform: x64
- Type: Systems management
- License: Trialware
- Website: www.microsoft.com/en-us/system-center

System Center Service Manager is a software product by Microsoft to allow organizations to manage incidents and problems.

Microsoft states that the product is compliant with industry best practices such as the Microsoft Operations Framework (MOF) and ITIL.

SCSM has integrated ITIL compliant fulfillment of service requests. Service requests are submitted by the end user in order to obtain information, access to a new application or the most common of all, password reset.

== See also ==
- Microsoft Servers
- Microsoft System Center
- System Center Data Protection Manager
- System Center Operations Manager
- System Center Virtual Machine Manager
- Configuration management
- Windows Server Update Services
- SYDI
