= System Center Essentials =

- Developer(s): Microsoft
- Final release: 2010
- Operating system: Microsoft Windows
- Type: Network administration
- License: Trialware
- Website: microsoft.com/sce

System Center Essentials (SCE) was a system management product from Microsoft targeting Windows systems for small and medium size businesses.

The product allows monitoring and alert resolution of server and client computers, applications, hardware, and network devices. Many Microsoft server products, such as Active Directory, Microsoft SQL Server, and Microsoft Exchange Server, can be monitored with SCE. SCE can manage up to 500 Windows clients and 50 servers.

Microsoft has made the decision not to deliver any further full version releases of System Center Essentials.

== Central concepts ==
The basic idea is to place a piece of software, an agent, on the computer to be monitored. The agent watches several sources on that computer, including the Windows Event Log, for specific events or alerts generated by the applications executing on the monitored computer. Upon alert occurrence and detection, the agent forwards the alert to the SCE server. This SCE server application maintains a database that includes a history of alerts. The SCE server applies filtering rules to alerts as they arrive; a rule can trigger some notification to a human, such as an e-mail or a pager message, or trigger some other workflow intended to correct the cause of the alert in an appropriate manner.

SCE uses the term management pack to refer to a set of filtering rules specific to some monitored application. While Microsoft and other software vendors make management packages available for their products, SCE also provides for authoring custom management packs. While an administrator role is needed to install agents, configure monitored computers and create management packs, rights to simply view the list of recent alerts can be given to any valid user account.

== Versions ==
- System Center Essentials 2007
- System Center Essentials 2010

== See also ==
- Microsoft Servers
- Microsoft System Center
- Microsoft Systems Management Server
