= PowerShell =

Cross-platform shell based on .NET technology

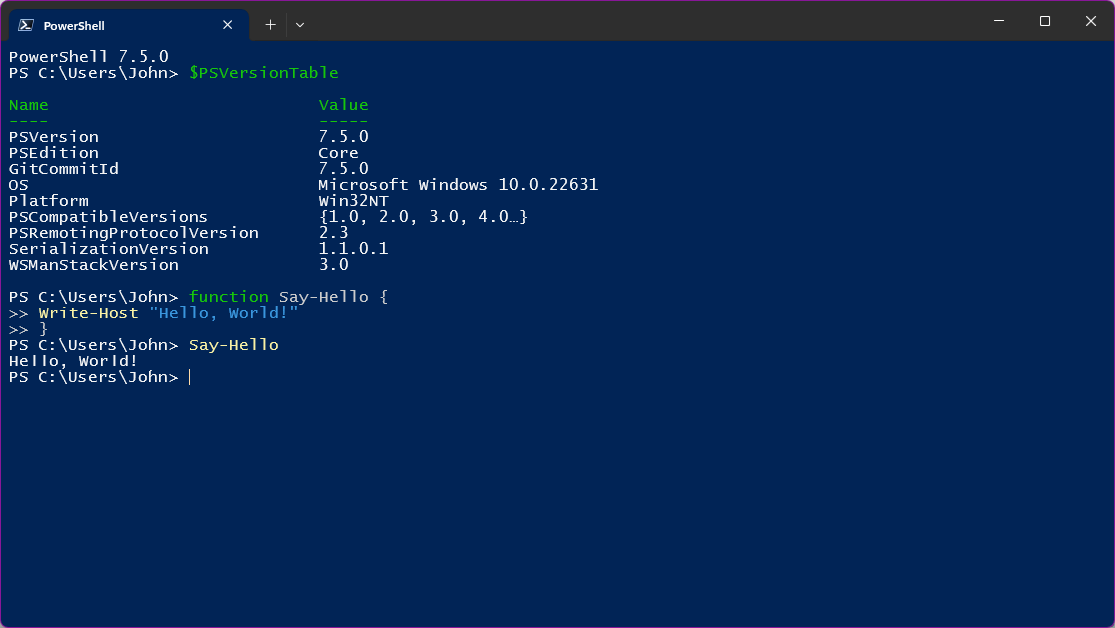
- Screenshot of a PowerShell 7.5.0 session in Windows Terminal
- Paradigm: Imperative, pipeline, object-oriented, functional and reflective
- Designed by: Jeffrey Snover, Bruce Payette, James Truher (et al.)
- Developer: Microsoft
- First appeared: November 14, 2006; 19 years ago
- Stable release: 7.7.0 / 10 November 2026; 2 days ago
- Typing discipline: Strong, safe, implicit and dynamic
- Implementation language: C#
- Platform: PowerShell: .NET; Windows PowerShell: .NET Framework
- OS: Windows 11 2024 Update and later; Windows Server 2025 and later; macOS 14 and later; Ubuntu since 22.04; Debian 12 and 13; Red Hat Enterprise Linux 8, 9 and 10; openSUSE 15.6 and 16.0; Fedora 42, 43 and 44
- License: MIT License (but the Windows component remains proprietary)
- Filename extensions: .ps1 (Script); .ps1xml (XML Document); .psc1 (Console File); .psd1 (Data File); .psm1 (Script Module); .pssc (Session Configuration File); .psrc (Role Capability File); .cdxml (Cmdlet Definition XML Document)
- Website: microsoft.com/powershell

Influenced by
- Python; Shell script; Perl; C#; CL; DCL; SQL; Tcl; Tk; Chef; Puppet

PowerShell is a shell program developed by Microsoft for task automation and configuration management. As is typical for a shell, it provides a command-line interpreter for interactive use and a script interpreter for automation via a language defined for it. Originally only for Windows, known as Windows PowerShell, it was made open-source and cross-platform on August 18, 2016, with the introduction of PowerShell Core. The former is built on the .NET Framework and the latter on .NET (previously .NET Core).

PowerShell is bundled with current versions of Windows and can be installed on macOS and Linux. Since Windows 10 build 14971, PowerShell replaced Command Prompt as the default command shell exposed by File Explorer.

In PowerShell, administrative tasks are generally performed via cmdlets (pronounced command-lets), which are specialized .NET classes implementing a particular operation. These work by accessing data in different data stores, like the file system or Windows Registry, which are made available to PowerShell via providers. Third-party developers can add cmdlets and providers to PowerShell. Cmdlets may be used by scripts, which may in turn be packaged into modules. Cmdlets work in tandem with the .NET API.

PowerShell's support for .NET Remoting, WS-Management, CIM, and SSH enables administrators to perform administrative tasks on both local and remote Windows systems. PowerShell also provides a hosting API with which the PowerShell runtime can be embedded inside other applications. These applications can then use PowerShell functionality to implement certain operations, including those exposed via the graphical interface. This capability has been used by Microsoft Exchange Server 2007 to expose its management functionality as PowerShell cmdlets and providers and implement the graphical management tools as PowerShell hosts which invoke the necessary cmdlets. Other Microsoft applications including Microsoft SQL Server 2008 also expose their management interface via PowerShell cmdlets.

PowerShell includes its own extensive, console-based help (similar to man pages in Unix shells) accessible via the Get-Help cmdlet. Updated local help contents can be retrieved from the Internet via the Update-Help cmdlet. Alternatively, help from the web can be acquired on a case-by-case basis via the -online switch to Get-Help.

== Background ==
Shell programs, including PowerShell, trace lineage to shells in older operating systems such as MS-DOS and Xenix which exposed system functionality to the user almost exclusively via a command-line interface (CLI) – although MS-DOS 5 also came with a complementary graphical DOS Shell. The Windows 9x family came bundled with COMMAND.COM, the command-line environment of MS-DOS. The Windows NT and Windows CE families, however, came with the newer cmd.exe – a significant upgrade from COMMAND.COM. Both environments provide CLI for both internal and external commands and automation via batch files – a relatively primitive language for scripting.

To address limitations of these shells – including the inability to directly use a software component exposed via COM – Microsoft introduced the Windows Script Host in 1998 with Windows 98, and its command-line based host, cscript.exe. It integrates with the Active Script engine and allows scripts to be written in compatible languages, such as JScript and VBScript. These scripts can use COM components directly, but it has relatively inaccessible documentation and gained a reputation as a system vulnerability vector after several high-profile computer viruses exploited weaknesses in its security provisions.

Different versions of Windows provided various special-purpose command-line interpreters (such as netsh and WMIC) with their own command sets but they were not interoperable. Windows Server 2003 further attempted to improve the command-line experience but scripting support was still unsatisfactory.

=== Kermit ===
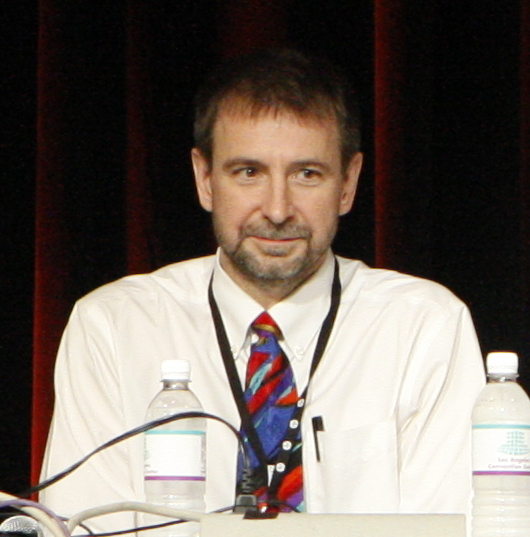
Microsoft program manager and PowerShell Chief Architect Jeffrey Snover

By the late 1990s, Intel had come to Microsoft asking for help in making Windows, which ran on Intel CPUs, a more appropriate platform to support the development of future Intel CPUs. At the time, Intel CPU development was accomplished on Sun Microsystems computers which ran Solaris (a Unix variant) on RISC-architecture CPUs. The ability to run Intel's many KornShell automation scripts on Windows was identified as a key capability. Internally, Microsoft began an effort to create a Windows port of Korn Shell, which was code-named Kermit. Intel ultimately pivoted to a Linux-based development platform that could run on Intel CPUs, rendering the Kermit project redundant. However, with a fully funded team, Microsoft program manager Jeffrey Snover realized there was an opportunity to create a more general-purpose solution to Microsoft's problem of administrative automation.

=== Monad ===
By 2002, Microsoft had started to develop a new approach to command-line management, including a CLI called Monad (also known as Microsoft Shell or MSH). The ideas behind it were published in August 2002 in a white paper called the "Monad Manifesto" by its chief architect, Jeffrey Snover. In a 2017 interview, Snover explains the genesis of PowerShell, saying that he had been trying to make Unix tools available on Windows, which didn't work due to "core architectural difference[s] between Windows and Linux". Specifically, he noted that Linux considers everything a text file, whereas Windows considers everything an "API that returns structured data". They were fundamentally incompatible, which led him to take a different approach.

Monad was to be a new extensible CLI with a fresh design capable of automating a range of core administrative tasks. Microsoft first demonstrated Monad publicly at the Professional Development Conference in Los Angeles in October 2003. A few months later, they opened up private beta, which eventually led to a public beta. Microsoft published the first Monad public beta release on June 17, 2005, and the Beta 2 on September 11, 2005, and Beta 3 on January 10, 2006.

=== PowerShell ===
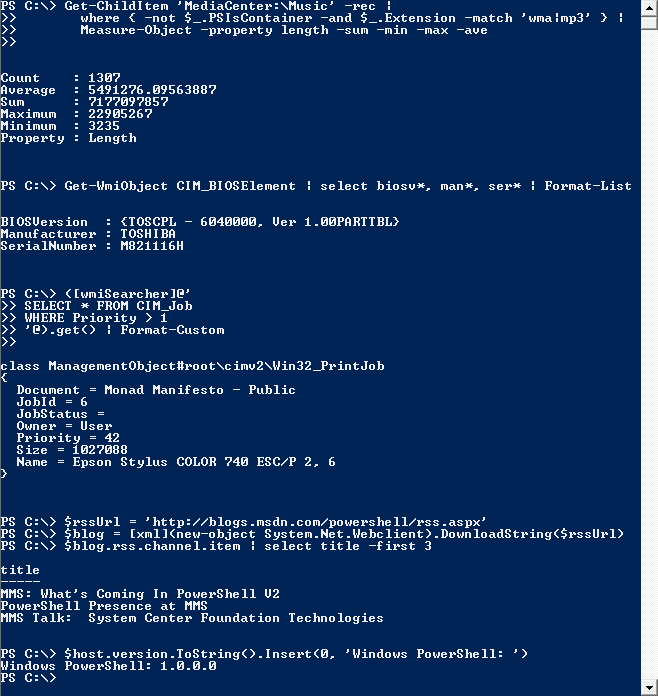
The first version of PowerShell

On April 25, 2006, two and a half years after the initial Monad announcement, Microsoft announced that Monad had been renamed Windows PowerShell, positioning it as a significant part of its management technology offerings. Release Candidate (RC) 1 of PowerShell was released at the same time. A significant aspect of both the name change and the RC was that this was now a component of Windows, rather than a mere add-on. The final 1.0 version was included as part of Windows Vista.

Release Candidate 2 of PowerShell version 1 was released on September 26, 2006, with final release to the web on November 14, 2006. PowerShell for earlier versions of Windows was released on January 30, 2007. PowerShell v2.0 development began before PowerShell v1.0 shipped. During the development, Microsoft shipped three community technology previews (CTP). Microsoft made these releases available to the public. The last CTP release of Windows PowerShell v2.0 was made available in December 2008.

PowerShell v2.0 was completed and released to manufacturing in August 2009, as an integral part of Windows 7 and Windows Server 2008 R2. Versions of PowerShell for Windows XP, Windows Server 2003, Windows Vista and Windows Server 2008 were released in October 2009 and are available for download for both 32-bit and 64-bit platforms. In an October 2009 issue of TechNet Magazine, Microsoft called proficiency with PowerShell "the single most important skill a Windows administrator will need in the coming years".

Windows 10 shipped with Pester, a script validation suite for PowerShell.

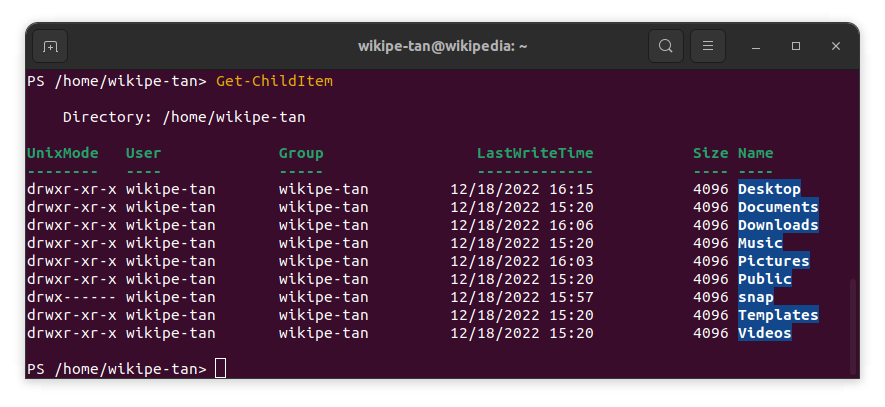
PowerShell for Linux 7.3.1 on Ubuntu 22.10

On August 18, 2016, Microsoft announced that they had made PowerShell open-source and cross-platform with support for Windows, macOS, CentOS and Ubuntu. The source code was published on GitHub. The move to open source created a second incarnation of PowerShell called "PowerShell Core", which runs on .NET Core. It is distinct from "Windows PowerShell", which runs on the full .NET Framework. Starting with version 5.1, PowerShell Core is bundled with Windows Server 2016 Nano Server.

=== Pash ===
A project named Pash, a pun on the widely known "bash" Unix shell, has been an open-source and cross-platform reimplementation of PowerShell via the Mono framework. Pash was created by Igor Moochnick, written in C# and was released under the GNU General Public License. Pash development stalled in 2008, was restarted on GitHub in 2012, and finally ceased in 2016 when PowerShell was officially made open-source and cross-platform.

== Philosophy ==
A key design goal for PowerShell was to leverage the large number of APIs that already existed in Windows, Windows Management Instrumentation, .NET Framework, and other software. PowerShell cmdlets generally wrap and expose existing functionality instead of implementing new functionality. The intent was to provide an administrator-friendly, more-consistent interface between administrators and a wide range of underlying functionality. With PowerShell, an administrator doesn't need to know .NET, WMI, or low-level API coding, and can instead focus on using the cmdlets exposed by PowerShell. In this regard, PowerShell creates little new functionality, instead focusing on making existing functionality more accessible to a particular audience.

== Commands ==
PowerShell provides an interactive command-line interface, where the commands can be entered and their output displayed. The user interface offers customizable tab completion.

PowerShell can execute four kinds of named commands:

- Cmdlets (pronounced command-lets), native PowerShell commands that adhere to PowerShell calling conventions
- PowerShell scripts (files bearing the .ps1 filename extension)
- PowerShell functions
- Executable files

The first three run with the invoking PowerShell process. Executable files will run in separate processes but may share the PowerShell window and even access the PowerShell pipeline. Tab completion is readily available for the first three. An add-on may enable tab completion for executable files. For instance, the git-completion-pwsh add-on enables tab completion for git.exe.

PowerShell enables the creation of aliases for cmdlets, which PowerShell textually translates into invocations of the original commands. Scripts, functions, and cmdlets support both named and positional parameters. PowerShell binds positional values to correct parameters during invocation.

=== Cmdlets ===
A cmdlet (pronounced command-lets) is a .NET class that derives either from the Cmdlet class or the PSCmdlet class, both of which reside in the System.Management.Automation namespace. The latter is used when it needs to interact with the PowerShell runtime. The base classes specify methods – BeginProcessing(), ProcessRecord() and EndProcessing() – which a cmdlet overrides to provide functionality based on the events that these functions represent. ProcessRecord() is called if the object receives pipeline input. If a collection of objects is piped, the method is invoked for each object in the collection. The cmdlet class must have the attribute CmdletAttribute which specifies the verb and the noun that make up the name of the cmdlet.

A cmdlet name follows a Verb-Noun naming pattern, such as Get-ChildItem, which tends to make it self-documented. Common verbs are provided as an enum.

If a cmdlet receives either pipeline input or command-line parameter input, there must be a corresponding property in the class, with a mutator implementation. PowerShell invokes the mutator with the parameter value or pipeline input, which is saved by the mutator implementation in class variables. These values are then referred to by the methods which implement the functionality. Properties that map to command-line parameters are marked by ParameterAttribute and are set before the call to BeginProcessing(). Those which map to pipeline input are also flanked by ParameterAttribute, but with the ValueFromPipeline attribute parameter set.

A cmdlet can use any .NET API and may be written in any .NET language. In addition, PowerShell makes certain APIs available, such as WriteObject(), which is used to access PowerShell-specific functionality, such as writing objects to the pipeline. A cmdlet can use .NET a data access API directly or use the PowerShell infrastructure of Providers, which make data stores addressable using unique paths. Data stores are exposed using drive letters, and hierarchies within them, addressed as directories. PowerShell ships with providers for the file system, registry, the certificate store, as well as the namespaces for command aliases, variables, and functions. PowerShell also includes various cmdlets for managing various Windows systems, including the file system, or using Windows Management Instrumentation to control Windows components. Other applications can register cmdlets with PowerShell, thus allowing it to manage them, and, if they enclose any datastore (such as a database), they can add specific providers as well.

A cmdlet can be added to the shell via modules or before v2 snap-ins. Users are not limited to the cmdlets included in the base PowerShell installation.

The number of cmdlets included in the base PowerShell install for various versions:

- Windows PowerShell 1.0: 129
- Windows PowerShell 2.0: 632
- Windows PowerShell 3.0: ≈1,000
- Windows PowerShell 5.0: ≈1,300
- Windows PowerShell 5.1: 1,586
- PowerShell 7.0: 1,507
- PowerShell 7.4: 1,656

=== Functions ===
Using the function keyword, PowerShell provides for the creation of functions. A simple function has the following general look:

function name ([Type1]$Param1, [Type2]$Param2) {
  # Instructions
}

Type1 and Type2 are valid .NET class names.

PowerShell allows for advanced functions that support named parameters, positional parameters, switch parameters, dynamic parameters, and cmdlet bindings.

function Verb-Noun {
  [CmdletBinding()]
  param (
    # Parameter 1 help description
    [Parameter(Attributes)] # e.g., "Mandatory" (boolean) or "Position" (number)
    [ValidationBehavior]    # e.g., "ValidateNotNullorEmpty"
    [Type1]                 # e.g., "String"
    $Param1,

    # Parameter 2 help description
    [Parameter(Attributes)]
    [ValidationBehavior]
    [Type2]
    $Param2
  )
  dynamicparam {
    # Definition of dynamic parameters
  }
  begin {
    # Set of instructions to run in preparation for processing a pipeline
  }
  process {
    # Set of instructions to treat each pipeline member, or prepare them for wholesale processing
  }
  end {
    # Set of instructions to process the pipeline as a whole and send it downstream
  }
}

The defined function is invoked in either of the following forms:

Verb-Noun value1 value2
Verb-Noun -Param1 value1 -Param2 value2

=== Scripts ===
Scripts written using PowerShell can be made to persist across sessions in either a script file (bearing the .ps1 extension ) or a script module file (bearing the .psm1 extension). The latter is used to implement a module. Later, either the entire script or individual functions in the script can be used.

Scripts and functions operate analogously with cmdlets, in that they can be used as commands in pipelines, and parameters can be bound to them. Pipeline objects can be passed between functions, scripts, and cmdlets seamlessly. (More details below.)

To prevent unintentional running of scripts, script execution is disabled by default and must be enabled explicitly. Enabling of scripts can be performed either at system, user or session level. PowerShell scripts can be signed to verify their integrity, and are subject to Code Access Security.

== Scripting ==
=== Grammar ===
PowerShell includes a dynamically typed language for scripting which can implement complex operations using cmdlets imperatively. The language supports variables, functions, branching (if-then-else), loops (while, do, for, and foreach), structured error/exception handling and closures/lambda expressions, as well as integration with .NET.

PowerShell's developers based the core grammar of the tool on that of the POSIX 1003.2 KornShell. However, PowerShell's language was also influenced by PHP, Perl, and many other existing languages.

=== Variables ===
Variables in PowerShell scripts are prefixed with $. By default, variables are dynamically typed, and can be assigned any value, including the output of a cmdlet. All variables are .NET objects.

PowerShell provides special variables, such as $args, which is an array of all the command-line arguments passed to a function from the command line, and $_, which refers to the current object in the pipeline.

PowerShell also recognizes arrays and associative arrays.

The PowerShell language supports binary prefix notation (such as "GB", "MB", and "KB") similar to the scientific notation supported by many programming languages in the C family. The engine parses these notations as it evaluates arithmetic expressions.

=== Strings ===
PowerShell accepts strings, both escaped and interpolated. A string enclosed between single quotation marks is treated as raw, with one exception: Two consecutive single quotation marks ('') are interpreted as a literal single quotation mark. A string enclosed between double quotation marks is an escaped interpolated string. PowerShell recognizes and variables inside the double quotation marks. PowerShell treats straight and curly quotes as equivalent. Additionally, PowerShell recognizes the following escape sequences:

PowerShell escape sequences
Sequence	Meaning
`0	Null
`a	Alert
`b	Backspace
`e	Escape (since PowerShell 6)
`f	Form feed
`n	Newline
`r	Carriage return
`t	Horizontal tab
`u{####}	Unicode character, where #### is the code point (since PowerShell 6)
`v	Vertical tab
--%	Treat any character from this point forward literally

=== Objects and classes ===
PowerShell can create and consume .NET classes and objects. As stated above, PowerShell variables, which are .NET objects, start with a dollar sign ($), e.g., $Param1. Classes names, however, appear inside square brackets ([]), e.g. [System.Console].

Like C#, the language uses the dot (.) notation to access object members and namespace members. Unlike C#, however, the language uses a colon pair (::) to access static members of classes because the dot notation is reserved for interrogating class reflections.

The following example demonstrates:

- Accessing the System namespace via the dot notation
- Accessing the Console class via the square bracket notation
- Accessing a static property of the Console class (Out) via the double colon notation
- Accessing the WriteLine method of the Out object via the dot notation

[System.Console]::Out.WriteLine("Hello, world")

=== Extended Type System ===
The PowerShell Extended Type System (ETS) is based on the .NET type system, but with extended semantics (for example, propertySets and third-party extensibility). For example, it enables the creation of different views of objects by exposing only a subset of the data fields, properties, and methods, as well as specifying custom formatting and sorting behavior. These views are mapped to the original object using XML-based configuration files.

=== Pipeline ===
To enable pipeline semantics, similar to the Unix pipeline, a cmdlet receives input and outputs result as objects. If a cmdlet outputs multiple objects, each object of the collection is passed through the pipeline before the next object is processed. A PowerShell pipeline enables complex logic using the pipe (|) operator to connect stages. However, the PowerShell pipeline differs from Unix pipelines in that stages execute within the PowerShell runtime rather than as a set of processes coordinated by the operating system. Additionally, structured .NET objects, rather than byte streams, are passed from one stage to the next. Using objects and executing stages within the PowerShell runtime eliminates the need to serialize data structures, or to extract them by explicitly parsing text output. An object can also encapsulate certain functions that work on the contained data, which become available to the recipient command for use. For the last cmdlet in a pipeline, PowerShell automatically pipes its output object to the Out-Default cmdlet, which transforms the objects into a stream of format objects and then renders those to the screen.

Because a PowerShell object is a .NET object, it has a .ToString() method which is used to serialize object state. In addition, PowerShell allows formatting definitions to be specified, so the text representation of objects can be customized by choosing which data elements to display, and in what manner. However, in order to maintain backward compatibility, if an external executable is used in a pipeline, it receives a text stream representing the object, instead of directly integrating with the PowerShell type system.

=== Error handling ===
For error handling, PowerShell provides a .NET-based exception-handling mechanism. In case of errors, objects containing information about the error (Exception object) are thrown, which are caught using the try ... catch construct (although a trap construct is supported as well). PowerShell can be configured to silently resume execution, without actually throwing the exception; this can be done either on a single command, a single session or perpetually.

== Hosting ==
One can also use PowerShell embedded in a management application, which uses the PowerShell runtime to implement the management functionality. For this, PowerShell provides a managed hosting API. Via the APIs, the application can instantiate a runspace (one instantiation of the PowerShell runtime), which runs in the application's process and is exposed as a Runspace object. The state of the runspace is encased in a SessionState object. When the runspace is created, the PowerShell runtime initializes the instantiation, including initializing the providers and enumerating the cmdlets, and updates the SessionState object accordingly. The Runspace then must be opened for either synchronous processing or asynchronous processing. After that it can be used to execute commands.

To execute a command, a pipeline (represented by a Pipeline object) must be created and associated with the runspace. The pipeline object is then populated with the cmdlets that make up the pipeline. For sequential operations (as in a PowerShell script), a Pipeline object is created for each statement and nested inside another Pipeline object. When a pipeline is created, PowerShell invokes the pipeline processor, which resolves the cmdlets into their respective assemblies (the command processor) and adds a reference to them to the pipeline, and associates them with InputPipe, OutputPipe and ErrorOutputPipe objects, to represent the connection with the pipeline. The types are verified and parameters bound using reflection. Once the pipeline is set up, the host calls the Invoke() method to run the commands, or its asynchronous equivalent, InvokeAsync(). If the pipeline has the Write-Host cmdlet at the end of the pipeline, it writes the result onto the console screen. If not, the results are handed over to the host, which might either apply further processing or display the output itself.

Microsoft Exchange Server 2007 uses the hosting APIs to provide its management GUI. Each operation exposed in the GUI is mapped to a sequence of PowerShell commands (or pipelines). The host creates the pipeline and executes them. In fact, the interactive PowerShell console itself is a PowerShell host, which interprets the scripts entered at command line and creates the necessary Pipeline objects and invokes them.

== Desired State Configuration ==
PowerShell Desired State Configuration (PSDSC) was originally a PowerShell component that allowed for declaratively specifying how a software environment should be configured.

Upon running a configuration, DSC will ensure that the system gets the state described in the configuration. DSC configurations are idempotent. The Local Configuration Manager (LCM) periodically polls the system using the control flow described by resources (imperative pieces of DSC) to make sure that the state of a configuration is maintained.

== Versions ==
=== Windows PowerShell ===
==== 1.0 ====
Named Windows PowerShell, version 1.0 was released in November 2006 for Windows XP SP2, Windows Server 2003 SP1 and Windows Vista and as an optional component of Windows Server 2008.

==== 2.0 ====
Windows PowerShell ISE v2.0 on Windows 7, an integrated development environment for PowerShell scripts

Version 2.0 integrates with Windows 7 and Windows Server 2008 R2 and was released for Windows XP SP3, Windows Server 2003 SP2, and Windows Vista SP1.

The version includes changes to the language and hosting API, in addition to including more than 240 new cmdlets.

New features include:

- Remoting: Using WS-Management, Allows scripts and cmdlets to be invoked on a remote machine or a large set of remote machines.
- Background jobs: Also called a PSJob, it allows a command sequence (script) or pipeline to be invoked asynchronously. Jobs can be run on the local machine or on multiple remote machines. An interactive cmdlet in a PSJob blocks the execution of the job until user input is provided.
- Transactions: Enable cmdlet and developers can perform transactional operations. Includes transaction cmdlets for starting, committing, and rolling back a PSTransaction as well as features to manage and direct the transaction to the participating cmdlet and provider operations. The PowerShell Registry provider supports transactions.
- Advanced functions: Initially called "script cmdlets", these bundled cmdlets was later renamed "advanced functions".
- SteppablePipelines: This allows the user to control when the BeginProcessing(), ProcessRecord() and EndProcessing() functions of a cmdlet are called.
- Modules: Allows script developers and administrators to organize and partition scripts in self-contained, reusable units. Code from a module executes in its own self-contained context and does not affect the state outside the module. Modules can define a restricted runspace environment by using a script. They have a persistent state as well as public and private members.
- Data language: A domain-specific subset of the language that allows data definitions to be decoupled from the scripts and allows localized string resources to be imported into the script at runtime (Script Internationalization).
- Script debugging: Allows breakpoints to be set in a script or function. Breakpoints can be set on lines, line & columns, commands and read or write access of variables. It includes a set of cmdlets to control the breakpoints via script.
- Eventing: Allows listening, forwarding, and acting on management and system events. Eventing allows hosts to be notified about state changes to their managed entities. It also enables scripts to subscribe to ObjectEvents, PSEvents, and WmiEvents and process them synchronously and asynchronously.
- Integrated Scripting Environment (ISE): GUI-based host that provides integrated debugger, syntax highlighting, tab completion and up to 8 Unicode-enabled consoles (Runspaces) in a tabbed UI, as well as the ability to run only the selected parts in a script.
- Network file transfer: Native support for prioritized, throttled, and asynchronous transfer of files between machines using the Background Intelligent Transfer Service (BITS).
- New cmdlets: Including Out-GridView, which displays tabular data in the WPF GridView object, on systems that allow it, and if ISE is installed and enabled.
- New operators: -Split, -Join, and Splatting (@) operators.
- Exception handling with Try-Catch-Finally: Unlike other .NET languages, this allows multiple exception types for a single catch block.
- Nestable Here-Strings: Here-Strings have been improved and can now nest.
- Block comments: Support for block comments using <# and #> as delimiters.
- New APIs: The new APIs range from handing more control over the parser and runtime to the host, to creating and managing collection of Runspaces (RunspacePools) as well as the ability to create Restricted Runspaces which only allow a configured subset of PowerShell to be invoked. The new APIs also support participation in a transaction

==== 3.0 ====
Version 3.0 integrates with Windows 8, Windows Server 2012, Windows 7 with Service Pack 1, Windows Server 2008 with Service Pack 1, and Windows Server 2008 R2 with Service Pack 1.

Version 3.0 is part of a larger package, Windows Management Framework 3.0 (WMF3), which also contains the WinRM service to support remoting. Microsoft made several Community Technology Preview releases of WMF3. An early community technology preview 2 (CTP 2) version of Windows Management Framework 3.0 was released on December 2, 2011. Windows Management Framework 3.0 was released for general availability in December 2012 and is included with Windows 8 and Windows Server 2012 by default.

New features include:

- Scheduled jobs: Jobs can be scheduled to run on a preset time and date using the Windows Task Scheduler infrastructure.
- Session connectivity: Sessions can be disconnected and reconnected. Remote sessions have become more tolerant of temporary network failures.
- Improved code writing: Code completion (IntelliSense) and snippets are added. ISE allows users to use dialog boxes to fill in parameters for cmdlets.
- Delegation support: Administrative tasks can be delegated to users who do not have permissions for that type of task, without granting them perpetual additional permissions.
- Help update: Help documentations can be updated via Update-Help command.
- Automatic module detection: Modules are loaded implicitly whenever a command from that module is invoked. Code completion works for unloaded modules as well.
- New commands: Dozens of new modules were added, including functionality to manage disks get-WmiObject win32_logicaldisk, volumes, firewalls, network connections, and printers, which had previously been performed via WMI.

==== 4.0 ====
Version 4.0 integrates with Windows 8.1, Windows Server 2012 R2, Windows 7 SP1, Windows Server 2008 R2 SP1 and Windows Server 2012.

New features include:

- Desired State Configuration: Declarative language extensions and tools that enable the deployment and management of configuration data for systems using the DMTF management standards and WS-Management Protocol
- New default execution policy: On Windows Servers, the default execution policy is now RemoteSigned.
- Save-Help: Help can now be saved for modules that are installed on remote computers.
- Enhanced debugging: The debugger now supports debugging workflows, remote script execution and preserving debugging sessions across session reconnections.
- -PipelineVariable switch: A new ubiquitous parameter to expose the current pipeline object as a variable for programming purposes
- Network diagnostics to manage physical and Hyper-V's virtualized network switches
- Where and ForEach method syntax provides an alternate method of filtering and iterating over objects.

==== 5.0 ====
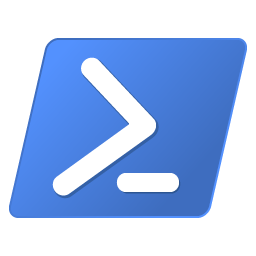
Version 5.0 icon

Version 5.0 was re-released with Windows Management Framework (WMF) 5.0 on February 24, 2016, following an initial release with a severe bug.

Key features included:

- The new class keyword that creates classes for object-oriented programming
- The new enum keyword that creates enums
- OneGet cmdlets to support the Chocolatey package manager
- Extending support for switch management to layer 2 network switches.
- Debugging for background jobs and instances hosted in other processes (each of which is called a "runspace")
- Desired State Configuration (DSC) Local Configuration Manager (LCM) version 2.0
- DSC partial configurations
- DSC Local Configuration Manager meta-configurations
- Authoring of DSC resources using classes

===== 5.1 =====
Version 5.1 was released along with the Windows 10 Anniversary Update on August 2, 2016, and in Windows Server 2016. PackageManagement now supports proxies, PSReadLine now has ViMode support, and two new cmdlets were added: Get-TimeZone and Set-TimeZone. The LocalAccounts module allows for adding/removing local user accounts. A preview for was released for Windows 7, Windows Server 2008, Windows Server 2008 R2, Windows Server 2012, and Windows Server 2012 R2 on July 16, 2016, and was released on January 19, 2017.

Version 5.1 is the first to come in two editions of "Desktop" and "Core". The "Desktop" edition is the continuation product line that uses the .NET Framework, and the "Core" edition runs on .NET Core and is bundled with Windows Server 2016 Nano Server. In exchange for smaller footprint, the latter lacks some features such as the cmdlets to manage clipboard or join a computer to a domain, WMI version 1 cmdlets, Event Log cmdlets and profiles. This was the final version exclusively for Windows. Version 5.1 remains pre-installed on Windows 10, Windows 11 and Windows Server 2022, while the .NET version needs to be installed separately and can run side-by-side with the .NET Framework version.

=== PowerShell Core ===
==== 6.0 ====
Renamed to PowerShell Core, version 6.0 was first announced on August 18, 2016, when Microsoft unveiled its decision to make the product cross-platform, independent of Windows, free and open source. It achieved general availability on January 10, 2018, for Windows, macOS and Linux. It has its own support lifecycle and adheres to the Microsoft lifecycle policy that is introduced with Windows 10: Only the latest version of PowerShell Core is supported. Microsoft expects to release one minor version for PowerShell Core 6.0 every six months.

The most significant change in this version is the expansion to the other platforms. For Windows administrators, this version did not include any major new features. In an interview with the community on January 11, 2018, the development team was asked to list the top 10 most exciting things that would happen for a Windows IT professional who would migrate from version 5.1 to version 6.0. In response, Angel Calvo of Microsoft could only name two: cross-platform and open-source. PowerShell 6 changed to UTF-8 as default encoding, with some exceptions. (version 7.4 changes more to UTF-8).

===== 6.1 =====
According to Microsoft, one of the new features of version 6.1 is "Compatibility with 1900+ existing cmdlets in Windows 10 and Windows Server 2019." Still, no details of these cmdlets can be found in the full version of the change log. Microsoft later professes that this number was insufficient as PowerShell Core failed to replace Windows PowerShell 5.1 and gain traction on Windows. It was, however, popular on Linux.

===== 6.2 =====
Version 6.2 is focused primarily on performance improvements, bug fixes, and smaller cmdlet and language enhancements that improved developer productivity.

=== PowerShell ===
==== 7.0 ====
Renamed to simply PowerShell, version 7 replaces the previous product lines: PowerShell Core and Windows PowerShell. The focus in development was to make version 7 a viable replacement for version 5.1, i.e. to have near parity with it in terms of compatibility with modules that ship with Windows.

New features include:

- The -Parallel switch for the ForEach-Object cmdlet to help handle parallel processing
- A new error view
- The Get-Error cmdlet
- Pipeline chaining operators (&& and ||) that allow conditional execution of the next cmdlet in the pipeline
- The ?: operator for ternary operation
- The ?? operator for null coalescing
- The ??= operator for null coalescing assignment
- Cross-platform Invoke-DscResource (experimental)
- Return of the Out-GridView cmdlet
- Return of the -ShowWindow switch for the Get-Help

===== 7.2 =====
Version 7.2 is the next long-term support version, after version 7.0. It uses .NET 6.0 and features universal installer packages for Linux. On Windows, updates to version 7.2 and later come via the Microsoft Update service; this feature has been missing from versions 6.0 through 7.1.

===== 7.3 =====
Version 7.3 includes some general Cmdlet updates and fixes, testing for framework dependent package in release pipeline as well as build and packaging improvements.

===== 7.4 =====
Version 7.4 is based on .NET 8 and is considered the long term support (LTS) release.

Changes include:

- webcmdlets default to UTF-8 encoding (changing from ASCII-superset ISO-8859-1, that does not support Unicode). Previously UTF-8 was default for other, but not all, things.

===== 7.5 =====
Version 7.5 was released in January 2025; it was built on .NET 9.0.1. It includes enhancements for performance, usability, and security. Key updates include improvements to tab completion, such as better type inference and new argument completers, as well as fixes for Invoke-WebRequest and Invoke-RestMethod. This release also adds the new ConvertTo-CliXml and ConvertFrom-CliXml cmdlets, and updates core modules like PSReadLine and Microsoft.PowerShell.PSResourceGet. Breaking changes include updates to Test-Path parameter handling, and default settings for New-FileCatalog.

Prior to GA Release there were 5 preview releases and 1 RC release of PowerShell v7.5.0, with a full release blog post for this version expected soon.

===== 7.6 =====
Version 7.6 is based on .NET 10. It was released on March 17, 2026.

Changes include:

- General cmdlet updates and fixes
- Update PowerShell Profile DSC resource manifests to allow null for content
- Add GitHub Actions annotations for Pester test failures
- Fix Import-Module.Tests.ps1 to handle Arm32 platform

===== 7.7 =====
Version 7.7 is based on .NET 11 and is the latest release. It was released on November 10, 2026.

== Comparison of cmdlets with similar commands ==
The following table contains various cmdlets that ship with PowerShell that have notably similar functionality to commands in other shells. Many of these cmdlets are exposed to the user via predefined aliases to make their use familiar to users of the other shells.

Comparison of cmdlets with commands of other shells
Cmdlet	Predefined alias	Command Prompt command	Unix shell command	Functionality
Clear-Host (Note: implemented as a predefined function)	cls, clear	cls	clear	Clears the screen
Compare-Object	compare, diff	fc	diff	Compares the content of two files
Copy-Item	cpi, copy, cp	copy	cp	Copies files and folders
Get-ChildItem	gci, dir, ls (Note: ls is absent from the Linux version of PowerShell Core)	dir	ls	Lists files and folders
Get-Command	gcm	help, where	type, which, compgen	Lists available commands and gets command path
Get-ComputerInfo	gin	systeminfo	uname -a	Retrieve system information
Get-Content	gc, type, cat	type	cat	Reports the content of a file
Get-Date		date + time	date	Reports date and time
Get-Help	help, man (Note: man is absent from the Linux version of PowerShell Core)	help	apropos, man	Reports a command's documentation
Get-History	ghy, h, history	DOSKEY /HISTORY	fc -l, history (Note: 'fc is defined in the POSIX standard and history is not. However most Unix implementations also define history.)	Lists previous commands
Get-Location	gl, pwd	cd	pwd	Reports the working directory
Get-Process	gps, ps	tlist, (Note: Available in Windows NT 4, Windows 98 Resource Kit, Windows 2000 Support Tools) tasklist (Note: Introduced in Windows XP Professional Edition)	ps	Reports running processes
Invoke-WebRequest	iwr, ~~curl, wget~~ (Note: curl and wget are absent from PowerShell Core, so as to not interfere with similarly named native commands)	curl	wget, curl	Downloads contents from the Internet
Measure-Command	—N/a	—N/a	time (Unix)	Reports elapsed time in the real world to execute the command that follows.
Measure-Object	measure	—N/a	wc	Counts characters, words and lines of text. Powershell adds summaries of numeric properties of objects
Move-Item	mi, move, mv	move	mv	Moves files and folders
Pop-Location	popd	popd	popd	Reverts the working directory to the path last pushed
Push-Location	pushd	pushd	pushd	Pushes the working directory path and changes the working directory
Read-Host		set /P	read	Reads input into a variable from the command line
Remove-Item	ri, del, erase, rmdir, rd, rm	del, erase, rmdir, rd	rm, rmdir	Deletes files or folders
Rename-Item	rni, ren	ren, rename	mv	Renames a file or folder
Register-ScheduledJob	—N/a	at, schtasks	at, cron	Schedule tasks to be run at a different time
Select-String	sls	find, findstr	grep	Reports lines of a file that match a pattern
Set-Date		date + time	date -s	Resets the date and time
Set-Location	sl, cd, chdir	cd, chdir	cd	Changes the working path
Set-Variable	sv, set	set	env, export, set, setenv	Creates or alters the contents of an environment variable
Sort-Object	sort	sort	sort	Sorts lines of text; cmdlet also sorts objects
Start-Sleep	sleep	sleep	timeout (Note: Windows cmd shell only)	Pauses the current process for a specified amount of time.
Stop-Process	spps, kill	kill, taskkill	kill (Note: Also used in UNIX to send a process any signal, the "Terminate" signal is merely the default)	Stops a running process
Tee-Object	tee	—N/a	tee	Pipes input to a file or variable, passing the input along the pipeline
Test-Connection	ping	ping	ping	Sends ICMP echo requests to a remote machine
Write-Output	echo, write	echo	echo	Writes text to standard output

== Filename extensions ==
Extension	Description
.ps1	Script file
.psd1	Module's manifest file; usually comes with a script module or binary module
.psm1	Script module file
.ps1xml	Format and type definitions file
.psc1	Console file
.pssc	Session configuration file
.psrc	Role Capability file

== Application support ==
Application	Version	Cmdlets	Provider	Management GUI
Exchange Server	2007	402	Yes	Yes
Windows Server	2008	Yes	Yes	No
Microsoft SQL Server	2008	Yes	Yes	No
Microsoft SharePoint	2010	Yes	Yes	No
System Center Configuration Manager	2012 R2	400+	Yes	No
System Center Operations Manager	2007	74	Yes	No
System Center Virtual Machine Manager	2007	Yes	Yes	Yes
System Center Data Protection Manager	2007	Yes	No	No
Windows Compute Cluster Server	2007	Yes	Yes	No
Microsoft Transporter Suite for Lotus Domino	08.02.0012	47	No	No
Microsoft PowerTools for Open XML	1.0	33	No	No
IBM WebSphere MQ	6.0.2.2	44	No	No
IoT Core Add-ons		74	Unknown	Unknown
Quest Management Shell for Active Directory	1.7	95	No	No
Special Operations Software Specops Command	1.0	Yes	No	Yes
VMware vSphere PowerCLI	6.5 R1	500+	Yes	Yes
Internet Information Services	7.0	54	Yes	No
Windows 7 Troubleshooting Center	6.1	Yes	No	Yes
Microsoft Deployment Toolkit	2010	Yes	Yes	Yes
NetApp PowerShell Toolkit	4.2	2000+	Yes	Yes
JAMS Scheduler – Job Access & Management System	5.0	52	Yes	Yes
UIAutomation	0.8	432	No	No
Dell Equallogic	3.5	55	No	No
LOGINventory	5.8	Yes	Yes	Yes
SePSX	0.4.1	39	No	No

== See also ==
- Common Information Model (computing)
- Comparison of command shells
- Comparison of programming languages
- List of open-source programming languages
- Web-Based Enterprise Management
- Windows Script Host
- Windows Terminal
