= System Center Virtual Machine Manager =

Windows Server System software

- Developer: Microsoft
- Stable release: 2025 U1 / September 2025
- Operating system: Windows Server 2016 and later
- Type: Hardware virtualization
- License: Trialware
- Website: https://learn.microsoft.com/en-us/system-center/vmm/?view=sc-vmm-2025

System Center Virtual Machine Manager (SCVMM) forms part of Microsoft's System Center line of virtual machine management and reporting tools, alongside previously established tools such as System Center Operations Manager and System Center Configuration Manager. SCVMM is designed for management of large numbers of Virtual Servers based on Microsoft Virtual Server and Hyper-V, and was released for enterprise customers in October 2007. A standalone version for small and medium business customers is available.

System Center Virtual Machine Manager enables increased physical server utilization by making possible simple and fast consolidation on virtual infrastructure. This is supported by consolidation candidate identification, fast Physical-to-Virtual (P2V) migration and intelligent workload placement based on performance data and user defined business policies (NOTE: P2V Migration capability was removed in SCVMM 2012r2). VMM enables rapid provisioning of new virtual machines by the administrator and end users using a self-service provisioning tool. Finally, VMM provides the central management console to manage all the building blocks of a virtualized data center.

Microsoft System Center 2016 Virtual Machine Manager was released in September 2016. This product enables the deployment and management of a virtualized, software-defined datacenter with a comprehensive solution for networking, storage, computing, and security.

Microsoft System Center 2019 Virtual Machine Manager was released in March 2019. It added features in the areas of Azure integration, computing, networking, security and storage.

Microsoft System Center 2022 Virtual Machine Manager RTM was released in March 2022. It can manage hosts with Windows Server 2022, Windows 11, Azure Stack HCI clusters RTM, and supports dual stack SDN deployment.

Microsoft System Center 2022 Virtual Machine Manager UR1 was released on November 15, 2022. It added features in the areas of support for Azure Stack HCI clusters 22H2, SQL Server 2022, VMware ESXI 7.0, and 8.0.

Microsoft System Center 2022 Virtual Machine Manager UR2, was released in November 2023, added features in the areas of support for VMware VMs with disk size greater than 2TB, Linux guest operating systems - Ubuntu Linux 22.04, Debian 11, Oracle Linux 8 and 9.

== See also ==
- Microsoft Servers
- Microsoft System Center
- System Center Data Protection Manager
- System Center Advisor
