= Storage Decisions =

Storage Decisions is a conference for data storage professionals in the United States. Produced by TechTarget, Storage Decisions has been held multiple times per year in the United States since 2001. TechTarget also presents a series one one-day seminars under the "Storage Decisions" name in the United States and Europe.

Storage Decisions events are oriented towards end users of data storage equipment and software. Presentations are given by independent analysts, end users, and storage experts. One differentiator for Storage Decisions events is the reduced access given to sponsoring product vendors: They are restricted from giving or attending presentations and are allowed to interact with the audience only during a short trade show session each day.

Despite the restrictions, the Storage Decisions events are popular with product vendors. Recent event sponsors include BlueArc, Dell, EMC, HP, IBM, and Symantec.

== Notable launches ==
- 2003 - Microsoft Windows Storage Server 2003, Cisco MDS 9100 and SN5428 Fibre Channel switches
- 2004 - Sun StorEdge 5210 and 6920, Cisco MDS 92161i and MDS 9000 Multiprotocol Services Module, Overland Storage REO 9000
- 2005 - Microsoft System Center Data Protection Manager (DPM) 2006, Symantec Backup Exec 10D
- 2010 - Cirtas Systems
