= Snover =

Snover may refer to:

- Charles A. Snover (1855–1916), Wisconsin politician
- Colonel Snover (1895–1969), American baseball pitcher
- Horace G. Snover (1847–1924), politician and judge from the U.S. state of Michigan
- Jeffrey Snover, lead architect of PowerShell and the Enterprise Cloud Group at Microsoft
- Snover, Michigan, community in Sanilac County named for Horace G. Snover
- Snover (Pokémon), a character that first appeared in the 4th generation of Pokémon
