= W2K16 =

W2K16 may refer to:

== Video games ==
- WWE 2K16, a professional wrestling video game created by Yuke's and Visual Concepts.

== Technology ==
- Windows Server 2016, an operating system released by Microsoft.
