= System Center Orchestrator =

Automation software tool by Microsoft

Microsoft System Center Orchestrator is an automation software tool that allows a user to automate the monitoring and deployment of data center resources. For example, it is capable of automatically deploying new operating systems or can forward alerts previously generated by System Center Operations Manager (SCOM) to an incident ticketing system like Microsoft System Center Service Manager.

Microsoft System Center Orchestrator, also known as Microsoft SCORCH, was first introduced as part of the Microsoft System Center 2012 suite on 12 December 2012. Microsoft bought in 2009 the software solution Opalis vNext and rebranded it into Orchestrator.

The latest stable version is Microsoft System Center Orchestrator 2019, build number is 10.19.40.0, which was released 14 March 2019.
