= System Center Advisor =

Software as a service offering from Microsoft Corporation

Microsoft System Center Advisor
- Website type: Web application (system software)
- Owner: Microsoft
- Creator: Microsoft
- Commercial: Yes
- Registration: Required
- Launched: January 2012; 14 years ago
- Current status: Superseded by Microsoft Azure Log Analytics azure.microsoft.com/en-us/services/log-analytics/.
- Content license: Proprietary

Microsoft System Center Advisor (SCA; formerly Codename Atlanta), is a commercial software as a service offering from Microsoft Corporation that helps change or assess the configuration of Microsoft Servers software over the Internet. It is part of Microsoft System Center brand.

System Center Advisor consists of a web service, an agent that collects data (an on-premises computer program) and a gateway (another on-premises component) that communicates with the service on behalf of the agent. The agent component needs to be installed on each server and the gateway needs to be installed in the same computer network. Once the agent, gateway and web service are properly configured, an administrator may use the web service to manage the configuration of the affected servers from any physical location that has an Internet.

System Center Advisor reached general availability in January 2012, having spent ten months in release candidate stage. It was made available in 26 countries through Microsoft Software Assurance offering, although it was possible to test-drive this service for 60 days. As of January 2013, it is a free service that supports:

- Windows Server 2008
- Windows Server 2008 R2
- Windows Server 2012
- Exchange Server 2010 and later
- Lync Server 2010 and later
- SharePoint Server 2010 and later
- SQL Server 2008 and later

Apart from the supported products, the System Center Advisor agent needs .NET Framework 3.5. The web service currently supports Internet Explorer 7 and later or Firefox 3.5 and later. It requires Microsoft Silverlight version 4.0 or later.

System Center Advisor was renamed to Azure Operational Insights in 2014 and became the Log Analytics service as part of the Microsoft Operations Management Suite in Azure.
