= Windows Server 2012 =

Version of Windows Server, released in 2012

- Version of the Windows NT operating system

- Screenshot of Windows Server 2012, showing the Server Manager application which is automatically opened when an administrator logs on, taskbar, and the blue color of Aero Lite
- Developer: Microsoft
- OS family: Windows Server
- Working state: No longer supported
- Source model: Closed-source; Source-available (through Shared Source Initiative)
- Released to manufacturing: August 1, 2012; 14 years ago
- General availability: September 4, 2012; 14 years ago
- Latest release: October 2026 monthly update rollup (6.2.9200.26434) / October 13, 2026; 35 days ago
- Marketing target: Business
- Update method: Windows Update, Windows Server Update Services, SCCM
- Supported platforms: x86-64
- Kernel type: Hybrid (Windows NT kernel)
- Default user interface: Windows shell (GUI)
- License: Commercial proprietary software
- Preceded by: Windows Server 2008 R2 (2009)
- Succeeded by: Windows Server 2012 R2 (2013)
- Official website: Windows Server 2012 (archived at Wayback Machine)

Support status
- Mainstream support ended on October 9, 2018; Extended support ended on October 10, 2023; Paid support via the Extended Security Updates program ended on October 13, 2026, only for volume licensed editions.

Windows Server 2012, codenamed "Windows Server 8", is the ninth major version of the Windows NT operating system produced by Microsoft to be released under the Windows Server brand name. It is the server version of Windows based on Windows 8 and succeeds the Windows 7-based Windows Server 2008 R2, released nearly three years earlier. Three pre-release versions, a developer preview, a beta version and a release candidate, were released during development. The software was officially launched on September 4, 2012, which was the month before the release of Windows 8. It was succeeded by Windows Server 2012 R2. Mainstream support ended on October 9, 2018, and extended support ended on October 10, 2023. It is eligible for the paid Extended Security Updates (ESU) program, which offers continued security updates until October 13, 2026.

It removed support for Itanium and processors without PAE, SSE2 and NX. Four editions were released. Various features were added or improved over Windows Server 2008 R2 (with many placing an emphasis on cloud computing), such as an updated version of Hyper-V, an IP address management role, a new version of Windows Task Manager, and ReFS, a new file system. Windows Server 2012 received generally good reviews in spite of having included the same controversial Metro-based user interface seen in Windows 8, which includes the Charms Bar for quick access to settings in the desktop environment.

It is the final version of Windows Server that supports processors without CMPXCHG16B (Compare and Exchange 16 Bytes), PrefetchW, LAHF and SAHF.

As of April 2017, 35% of servers were running Windows Server 2012, surpassing usage share of Windows Server 2008.

== History ==
Windows Server 2012, codenamed "Windows Server 8", is the fifth release of Windows Server family of operating systems developed concurrently with Windows 8.

Microsoft introduced Windows Server 2012 and its developer preview in the BUILD 2011 conference on September 9, 2011. However, unlike Windows 8, the developer preview of Windows Server 2012 was only made available to MSDN subscribers. It included a graphical user interface (GUI) based on Metro design language and a new Server Manager, a graphical application used for server management. On February 16, 2012, Microsoft released an update for developer preview build that extended its expiry date from April 8, 2012 to January 15, 2013.

Before Windows Server 2012 was finalized, two test builds were made public. A public beta version of Windows Server 2012 was released along with the Windows 8 Consumer Preview on February 29, 2012. On April 17, 2012, Microsoft revealed "Windows Server 2012" as the final name for the operating system. The release candidate of Windows Server 2012 was released on May 31, 2012, along with the Windows 8 Release Preview.

The product was released to manufacturing on August 1, 2012 (along with Windows 8) and became generally available on September 4, that year. However, not all editions of Windows Server 2012 were released at the same time. Windows Server 2012 Essentials was released to manufacturing on October 9, 2012 and was made generally available on November 1, 2012. As of September 23, 2012, all students subscribed to DreamSpark program can download Windows Server 2012 Standard or Datacenter free of charge.

Windows Server 2012 is based on Windows 8 and is the second version of Windows Server which runs only on 64-bit CPUs. Coupled with fundamental changes in the structure of the client backups and the shared folders, there is no clear method for migrating from the previous version to Windows Server 2012.

== Features ==
Windows Server 2012 Start screen, with tools used in a server pinned on the Start screen by default

=== Installation options ===
Unlike its predecessor, Windows Server 2012 users can switch between "Server Core" and "Server with a GUI" installation options without a full re-installation. Server Core – an option with a command-line interface only – is now the recommended configuration. There is also a third installation option that allows some GUI elements such as MMC and Server Manager to run, but without the normal desktop, shell or default programs like File Explorer.

=== User interface ===
Server Manager has been redesigned with an emphasis on easing management of multiple servers. The operating system, like Windows 8, uses the Metro-based user interface unless installed in Server Core mode. The Windows Store is available by installing the desktop experience feature from the server manager, but is not installed by default. Windows PowerShell in this version has over 2300 commandlets, compared to around 200 in Windows Server 2008 R2.

=== Task Manager ===
Windows Server 2012 includes a new version of Windows Task Manager together with the old version. In the new version the tabs are hidden by default, showing applications only. In the new Processes tab, the processes are displayed in varying shades of yellow, with darker shades representing heavier resource use. Information found in the older versions are now moved to the new Details tab. The Performance tab shows "CPU", "Memory", "Disk", "Wi-Fi" and "Ethernet" graphs. Unlike the Windows 8 version of Task Manager (which looks similar), the "Disk" activity graph is not enabled by default. The CPU tab no longer displays individual graphs for every logical processor on the system by default, although that remains an option. Additionally, it can display data for each non-uniform memory access (NUMA) node. When displaying data for each logical processor for machines with more than 64 logical processors, the CPU tab now displays simple utilization percentages on heat-mapping tiles. The color used for these heat maps is blue, with darker shades again indicating heavier utilization. Hovering the cursor over any logical processor's data now shows the NUMA node of that processor and its ID, if applicable. Additionally, a new Startup tab has been added that lists startup applications, however this tab does not exist in Windows Server 2012. The new task manager recognizes when a Windows Store app has the "Suspended" status.

=== IP address management (IPAM) ===
Windows Server 2012 has an IP address management role for discovering, monitoring, auditing, and managing the IP address space used on a corporate network. The IPAM is used for the management and monitoring of Domain Name System (DNS) and Dynamic Host Configuration Protocol (DHCP) servers. Both IPv4 and IPv6 are fully supported.

=== Active Directory ===
Windows Server 2012 has a number of changes to Active Directory from the version shipped with Windows Server 2008 R2. The Active Directory Domain Services installation wizard has been replaced by a new section in Server Manager, and a GUI has been added to the Active Directory Recycle Bin. Multiple password policies can be set in the same domain. Active Directory in Windows Server 2012 is now aware of any changes resulting from virtualization, and virtualized domain controllers can be safely cloned. Upgrades of the domain functional level to Windows Server 2012 are simplified; it can be performed entirely in Server Manager. Active Directory Federation Services is no longer required to be downloaded when installed as a role, and claims which can be used by the Active Directory Federation Services have been introduced into the Kerberos token. Windows Powershell commands used by Active Directory Administrative Center can be viewed in a "Powershell History Viewer".

=== Hyper-V ===
Windows Server 2012, along with Windows 8, includes a new version of Hyper-V, as presented at the Microsoft BUILD event. Many new features have been added to Hyper-V, including network virtualization, multi-tenancy, storage resource pools, cross-premises connectivity, and cloud backup. Additionally, many of the former restrictions on resource consumption have been greatly lifted. Each virtual machine in this version of Hyper-V can access up to 64 virtual processors, up to 1 terabyte of memory, and up to 64 terabytes of virtual disk space per virtual hard disk (using a new .vhdx format). Up to 1024 virtual machines can be active per host, and up to 8000 can be active per failover cluster. SLAT is a required processor feature for Hyper-V on Windows 8, while for Windows Server 2012 it is only required for the supplementary RemoteFX role.

=== ReFS ===
Resilient File System (ReFS), codenamed "Protogon", is a new file system in Windows Server 2012 initially intended for file servers that improves on NTFS in some respects. Major new features of ReFS include:

Improved reliability for on-disk structures
ReFS uses B+ trees for all on-disk structures including metadata and file data. Metadata and file data are organized into tables similar to a relational database. The file size, number of files in a folder, total volume size and number of folders in a volume are limited by 64-bit numbers; as a result ReFS supports a maximum file size of 16 exabytes, a maximum of 18.4 × 10^{18} folders and a maximum volume size of 1 yottabyte (with 64 KB clusters) which allows large scalability with no practical limits on file and folder size (hardware restrictions still apply). Free space is counted by a hierarchical allocator which includes three separate tables for large, medium, and small chunks. File names and file paths are each limited to a 32 KB Unicode text string.
Built-in resilience
ReFS employs an allocation-on-write update strategy for metadata, which allocates new chunks for every update transaction and uses large IO batches. All ReFS metadata has built-in 64-bit checksums which are stored independently. The file data can have an optional checksum in a separate "integrity stream", in which case the file update strategy also implements allocation-on-write; this is controlled by a new "integrity" attribute applicable to both files and directories. If nevertheless file data or metadata becomes corrupt, the file can be deleted without taking the whole volume offline. As a result of built-in resiliency, administrators do not need to periodically run error-checking tools such as CHKDSK when using ReFS.
Compatibility with existing APIs and technologies
ReFS does not require new system APIs and most file system filters continue to work with ReFS volumes. ReFS supports many existing Windows and NTFS features such as BitLocker encryption, Access Control Lists, USN Journal, change notifications, symbolic links, junction points, mount points, reparse points, volume snapshots, file IDs, and oplock. ReFS seamlessly integrates with Storage Spaces, a storage virtualization layer that allows data mirroring and striping, as well as sharing storage pools between machines. ReFS resiliency features enhance the mirroring feature provided by Storage Spaces and can detect whether any mirrored copies of files become corrupt using background data scrubbing process, which periodically reads all mirror copies and verifies their checksums then replaces bad copies with good ones.

Some NTFS features are not supported in ReFS, including object IDs, short names, file compression, file level encryption (EFS), user data transactions, hard links, extended attributes, and disk quotas. Sparse files are supported. Support for named streams is not implemented in Windows 8 and Windows Server 2012, though it was later added in Windows 8.1 and Windows Server 2012 R2. ReFS does not itself offer data deduplication. Dynamic disks with mirrored or striped volumes are replaced with mirrored or striped storage pools provided by Storage Spaces. In Windows Server 2012, automated error-correction with integrity streams is only supported on mirrored spaces; automatic recovery on parity spaces was added in Windows 8.1 and Windows Server 2012 R2. Booting from ReFS is not supported either.

=== IIS 8.0 ===
Windows Server 2012 includes version 8.0 of Internet Information Services (IIS). The new version contains new features such as SNI, CPU usage caps for particular websites, centralized management of SSL certificates, WebSocket support and improved support for NUMA, but few other substantial changes were made.

=== Remote Desktop Protocol 8.0 ===
Remote Desktop Protocol has new functions such as Adaptive Graphics (progressive rendering and related techniques), automatic selection of TCP or UDP as transport protocol, multi touch support, DirectX 11 support for vGPU, USB redirection supported independently of vGPU support, etc. A "connection quality" button is displayed in the RDP client connection bar for RDP 8.0 connections; clicking on it provides further information about connection, including whether UDP is in use or not.

=== Scalability ===
Windows Server 2012 supports the following maximum hardware specifications. Windows Server 2012 improves over its predecessor Windows Server 2008 R2:

Specification	Windows Server 2012	Windows Server 2008 R2
Physical processors (Note: Applies to Windows Server 2008 R2 and 2012 Datacenter and Windows Server 2012 Standard only. Other editions support less.)	64	64
Logical processors when Hyper-V is disabled	640	256
Logical processors when Hyper-V is enabled	320 (Note: Each virtualized partition, including the host itself, can use up to 64 processors.)	64
Memory	4 TB	2 TB
Failover cluster nodes (in any single cluster)	64	16

== System requirements ==
Minimum system requirements for Windows Server 2012
Processor	1.4 GHz, x64
Memory	512 MB
Free disk space	32 GB (more if there is at least 16 GB of RAM)

Windows Server 2012 runs only on x86-64 processors. Unlike older versions, Windows Server 2012 does not support Itanium.

Upgrades from Windows Server 2008 and Windows Server 2008 R2 are supported, although upgrades from prior releases are not.

== Editions ==
Windows Server 2012 has four editions: Foundation, Essentials, Standard and Datacenter.

Specifications	Foundation	Essentials	Standard	Datacenter
Distribution	OEM only	Retail, volume licensing, OEM		Volume licensing and OEM
Licensing model	Per server		Per CPU pair (Note: Each license of Windows Server 2012 Standard or Datacenter allows up to two processor chips. Each license of Windows Server 2012 Standard allows up to two virtual instances of Windows Server 2012 Standard on that physical server. If more virtual instances of Windows Server 2012 Standard are needed, each additional license of Windows Server 2012 allows up to two more virtual instances of Windows Server 2012 Standard, even though the physical server itself may have sufficient licenses for its processor chip count. Because Windows Server 2012 Datacenter has no limit on the number of virtual instances per licensed server, only enough licenses for the physical server are needed for any number of virtual instances of Windows Server 2012 Datacenter. If the number of processor chips or virtual instances is an odd number, the number of licenses required is the same as the next even number. For example, a single-processor-chip server would still require 1 license, the same as if the server were two-processor-chip and a five-processor-chip server would require 3 licenses, the same as if the server were six-processor-chip, and if 15 virtual instances of Windows Server 2012 Standard are needed on one server, 8 licenses of Windows Server 2012, which can cover up to 16 virtual instances, are needed (assuming, in this example, that the processor chip count does not exceed 16).) + CAL (Note: For the Standard and Datacenter editions, each user or device accessing the software must have a client access license (CAL) assigned (either per-user or per-device), so there may be no more simultaneous users than the number of client-access licenses, except up to 2 simultaneous users purely to administer the server software, or for running virtualization or web workloads. Remote Desktop Services requires an additional CAL separate from the aforementioned CAL.)	
Processor chip limit	1	2	64 (Note: If the number of physical processors in a particular server is under 64, the limit is determined by the quantity of licenses assigned to that server. In that case, the number of physical processors cannot exceed twice the number of licenses assigned to the server.)	
Memory limit	32 GB	64 GB	4 TB	
User limit	15	25	Unlimited	Unlimited
File sharing limits	1 standalone DFS root	1 standalone DFS root	Unlimited	Unlimited
Network Policy and Access Services limits	50 RRAS connections and 10 IAS connections	250 RRAS connections, 50 IAS connections, and 2 IAS Server Groups	Unlimited	Unlimited
Remote Desktop Services limits	50 Remote Desktop Services connections	Gateway only	Unlimited	Unlimited
Virtualization rights	—N/a	Either in 1 VM or 1 physical server, but not both at once	2 VMs	Unlimited
Active Directory Lightweight Directory Services	Yes	Yes	Yes	Yes
Active Directory Federation Services	Yes	Yes	Yes	Yes
Active Directory Rights Management Services	Yes	Yes	Yes	Yes
Application server role	Yes	Partial	Yes	Yes
DHCP role	Yes	Yes	Yes	Yes
DNS server role	Yes	Yes	Yes	Yes
Fax server role	Yes	Yes	Yes	Yes
Print and document services	Yes	Yes	Yes	Yes
Server Manager	Yes	Yes	Yes	Yes
UDDI services	Yes	Yes	Yes	Yes
Web services (Internet Information Services)	Yes	Yes	Yes	Yes
Windows Deployment Services	Yes	Yes	Yes	Yes
Windows Powershell	Yes	Yes	Yes	Yes
Active Directory Domain Services	Must be root of forest and domain	Yes	Yes	Yes
Active Directory Certificate Services	Certificate Authorities only	Certificate Authorities only	Yes	Yes
Hyper-V	No	R2 onwards	Yes	Yes
Server Core mode	No	No	Yes	Yes
Windows Server Update Services	No	No	Yes	Yes

== Reception ==
Reviews of Windows Server 2012 have been generally positive. Simon Bisson of ZDNet described it as "ready for the datacenter, today," while Tim Anderson of The Register said that "The move towards greater modularity, stronger automation and improved virtualisation makes perfect sense in a world of public and private clouds" but remarked that "That said, the capability of Windows to deliver obscure and time-consuming errors is unchanged" and concluded that "Nevertheless, this is a strong upgrade overall."

InfoWorld noted that Server 2012's use of Windows 8's panned "Metro" user interface was countered by Microsoft's increasing emphasis on the Server Core mode, which had been "fleshed out with new depth and ease-of-use features" and increased use of the "practically mandatory" PowerShell. However, Michael Otey of Windows IT Pro expressed dislike with the new Metro interface and the lack of ability to use the older desktop interface alone, saying that most users of Windows Server manage their servers using the graphical user interface rather than PowerShell.

Paul Ferrill wrote that "Windows Server 2012 Essentials provides all the pieces necessary to provide centralized file storage, client backups, and remote access," but Tim Anderson contended that "Many businesses that are using SBS2011 and earlier will want to stick with what they have", citing the absence of Exchange, the lack of ability to synchronize with Active Directory Federation Services and the 25-user limit, while Paul Thurott wrote "you should choose Foundation only if you have at least some in-company IT staff and/or are comfortable outsourcing management to a Microsoft partner or solution provider" and "Essentials is, in my mind, ideal for any modern startup of just a few people."

== Windows Server 2012 R2 ==
A second release, Windows Server 2012 R2, which is derived from the Windows 8.1 codebase, was released to manufacturing on August 27, 2013 and became generally available on October 18, 2013, by Microsoft. An updated version, formally designated Windows Server 2012 R2 Update, was released in April 2014.

== Support lifecycle ==
Microsoft originally planned to end mainstream support for Windows Server 2012 and Windows Server 2012 R2 on January 9, 2018, with extended support ending on January 10, 2023. In order to provide customers the standard transition lifecycle timeline, Microsoft extended Windows Server 2012 and 2012 R2 support in March 2017 by 9 months. Windows Server 2012 reached the end of mainstream support on October 9, 2018 and entered the extended support phase, which ended on October 10, 2023.

Microsoft announced in July 2021 that they will distribute paid Extended Security Updates for volume licensed editions of Windows Server 2012 and Windows Server 2012 R2 for up to 3 years after the end of extended support. The Extended Security Updates program for Windows Server 2012 ended on October 13, 2026, marking the final end of all security updates for the Windows NT 6.2 product line after 14 years, 2 months and 12 days.

== See also ==
- Comparison of Microsoft Windows versions
- Comparison of operating systems
- History of Microsoft Windows
- List of operating systems
- Microsoft Servers
