= Jeffrey Snover =

American software architect, the inventor of PowerShell

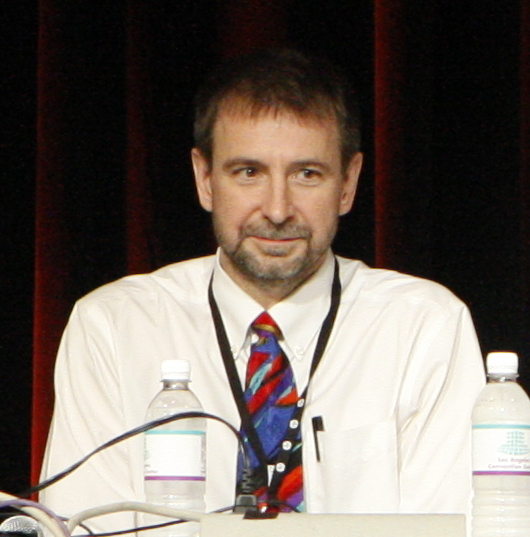
- Snover at the Professional Developers Conference 2009 Technical Leaders Panel
- Education: University of New Hampshire
- Occupations: Programmer, Chief Architect, Site Reliability Engineer
- Employer: Harvard
- Known for: PowerShell, Windows Server, Azure Stack
- Title: Fellow

Jeffrey Snover, a fellow at the Harvard Law School, is the chief architect of Microsoft Management Console (MMC) and the inventor of PowerShell, an object-based scripting language and command line shell for system administration and automation.

After dropping out of the University of New Hampshire in 1982, he worked as architect and development manager for Tivoli NetView at Tivoli Software (IBM), and as a consulting engineer and development manager at DEC. He joined Microsoft in 1999, where he invented Microsoft Management Console and PowerShell. He became a Technical Fellow as well as the chief architect for PowerShell, Windows Server, and the Azure Infrastructure and Management group, which includes Azure Stack, System Center and Operations Management Suite.

Snover left Microsoft 2022, and began working as a Distinguished Engineer at Google. He retired from Google in 2026.

== Biography ==
=== Before Microsoft ===
After studying, but not receiving a degree in physics at the University of New Hampshire (1978–1982), Snover worked as architect and development manager for Tivoli NetView at Tivoli Software (IBM), and as a consulting engineer and development manager at DEC, where he led various network and systems management projects. He also worked at Storage Technology Corporation, and various start-up companies. Snover held eight patents prior to joining Microsoft, and has registered over 30 patents since.

=== At Microsoft ===
Snover joined Microsoft in 1999 as divisional architect for the Management and Services Division, providing technical direction for Microsoft's management technologies and products. He was also the Chief Architect of the Microsoft Management Console (MMC).

Snover is known primarily as the "father" and chief architect of PowerShell, an object-oriented command line interpreter. PowerShell's development began under the codename "Monad" in early 2003, based on the idea of Bourne shell, but using .NET objects instead of text streams in the pipeline. The intentional similarity to Unix shells was to use a familiar paradigm to make it easier for Unix administrators to make the transition to Windows administration. The prototype was implemented in the C# programming language.

The Monad manifesto faced fierce resistance from the rest of Microsoft and caused Snover's demotion. Snover describes the 2002–2006 time period as painful, frustrating, and embarrassing. After the completion of version 1.0 in November 2006, PowerShell was downloaded nearly one million times within half a year.

In 2015, Microsoft promoted Snover to Technical Fellow. In 2019 he was the AI architect for the Microsoft 365 substrate and became the CTO for Modern Workforce Transformation. In the same year, Snover starred in a video series known as "Getting Started With PowerShell" for Microsoft Virtual Academy.

=== After Microsoft ===
In 2022 he left Microsoft and became an SRE Google Distinguished Engineer. He retired from Google in January 2026.

== Bibliography ==
- Snover, Jeffrey: Monad Manifesto – the Origin of Windows PowerShell, 2007
- Grigoreanu, Valentina; Brundage, James; Bahna, Eric; Burnett, Margaret; ElRif, Paul; Snover, Jeffrey (2009). "Males' and Females' Script Debugging Strategies". Proceedings of 2nd International Symposium on End-User Development. IS-EUD 2009. LNCS. Vol. 5435. pp. 205–224. doi:10.1007/978-3-642-00427-8_12. ISBN 978-3-642-00425-4. ISSN 0302-9743.
