= Windows Server 2008 R2 =

Version of Windows Server, released in 2009

- Version of the Windows NT operating system

- Screenshot of Windows Server 2008 R2 showing the Server Manager application which is automatically opened when an administrator logs on
- Developer: Microsoft
- OS family: Windows Server
- Working state: No longer supported
- Source model: Closed-source; Source-available (through Shared Source Initiative)
- Released to manufacturing: July 22, 2009; 17 years ago
- General availability: October 22, 2009; 17 years ago
- Latest release: Service Pack 1 with January 2026 monthly update rollup (6.1.7601.28117) / January 13, 2026; 9 months ago
- Marketing target: Business
- Update method: Windows Update, Windows Server Update Services, SCCM
- Supported platforms: x86-64, Itanium
- Kernel type: Hybrid (Windows NT kernel)
- Default user interface: Windows shell (Graphical)
- License: Commercial proprietary software (Retail, volume licensing, Microsoft Software Assurance)
- Preceded by: Windows Server 2008 (2008)
- Succeeded by: Windows Server 2012 (2012)
- Official website: Windows Server 2008 R2 (archived at Wayback Machine)

Support status
- Mainstream support ended on January 13, 2015; Extended support ended January 14, 2020 Paid updates; only for Standard, Enterprise, and Datacenter volume licensed editions: ESU (Extended Security Updates) support ended on January 10, 2023, for non-Azure & January 9, 2024, for Azure. Grandfathered Premium Assurance security update support ended on January 13, 2026. See § Paid extended updates for details.

Windows Server 2008 R2, codenamed "Windows Server 7" is the eighth major version of the Windows NT operating system produced by Microsoft to be released under the Windows Server brand name. It was released to manufacturing on July 22, 2009, and became generally available on October 22, 2009, the same respective release dates of Windows 7. It is the successor to the Windows Vista-based Windows Server 2008, released the previous year, and was succeeded by the Windows 8-based Windows Server 2012.

Windows Server 2008 R2 was intended to be an incremental upgrade to Windows Server 2008, and its enhancements include new functionality for Active Directory, new virtualization and management features, version 7.5 of the Internet Information Services web server and support for up to 256 logical processors. It is built on the same kernel used with the client-oriented Windows 7, and is the first server operating system released by Microsoft which dropped support for 32-bit processors, an addition which carried over to the consumer-oriented Windows 11.

It is the final version of Windows Server that includes Enterprise and Web Server editions, the final that got a service pack from Microsoft and the final version that supports IA-64 and processors without PAE, SSE2 and NX (although a 2018 update dropped support for non-SSE2 processors).

Seven editions of Windows Server 2008 R2 were released: Foundation, Standard, Enterprise, Datacenter, Web, HPC Server and Itanium, as well as Windows Storage Server 2008 R2. A home server variant called Windows Home Server 2011 was also released.

== History ==
Microsoft introduced Windows Server 2008 R2 at the 2008 Professional Developers Conference as the server variant of Windows 7, based on the Windows NT kernel.

On January 7, 2009, a beta release of Windows Server 2008 R2 was made available to subscribers of Microsoft's TechNet and MSDN programs, as well as those participating in the Microsoft Connect program for Windows 7. Two days later, the beta was released to the public via the Microsoft Download Center.

On April 30, 2009, the release candidate was made available to subscribers of TechNet and MSDN. On May 5, 2009, the release candidate was made available to the public via the Microsoft download center.

According to Windows Server Blog, the following are the dates of the year 2009 when Microsoft Windows Server 2008 R2 has been made available to various distribution channels:

- OEMs received Windows Server 2008 R2 in English and all language packs on July 29. The remaining languages were available around August 11.
- Independent software vendor (ISV) and independent hardware vendor (IHV) partners have been able to download Windows Server 2008 R2 from MSDN starting on August 14.
- IT professionals with TechNet subscriptions were able to download Windows Server 2008 R2 and obtain product keys for English, French, German, Italian, and Spanish variants beginning August 14 and all remaining languages beginning August 21.
- Developers with MSDN subscriptions have been able to download and obtain product keys for Windows Server 2008 R2 in English, French, German, Italian, and Spanish starting August 14 and all remaining languages starting August 21.
- Microsoft Partner Program (MPP) gold/certified members were able to download Windows Server 2008 R2 through the MPP portal on August 19.
- Volume licensing customers with an existing Software Assurance (SA) contracts were able to download Windows Server 2008 R2 on August 19 via the Volume License Service Center.
- Volume licensing customers without an SA were able to purchase Windows Server 2008 R2 through volume licensing by September 1.

Additionally, qualifying students have been able to download Windows Server 2008 R2 Standard edition in 15 languages from the Microsoft Imagine program (known as DreamSpark at the time).

== New features ==
A reviewer guide published by the company describes several areas of improvement in R2. These include new virtualization capabilities (Live Migration, Cluster Shared Volumes using Failover Clustering and Hyper-V), reduced power consumption, a new set of management tools and new Active Directory capabilities such as a "recycle bin" for deleted objects. IIS 7.5 has been added to this release which also includes updated FTP server services. Security enhancements include encrypted clientless authenticated VPN services through DirectAccess for clients using Windows 7, and the addition of DNSSEC support for DNS Server Service. Even though DNSSEC as such is supported, only one signature algorithm is available: #5/RSA/SHA-1. Since many zones use a different algorithm – including the root zone – this means that in reality Windows still can't serve as a recursive resolver.

The DHCP server supports a large number of enhancements such as MAC address-based control filtering, converting active leases into reservations or link layer based filters, DHCppP Name protection for non-Windows machines to prevent name squatting, better performance through aggressive lease database caching, DHCP activity logging, auto-population of certain network interface fields, a wizard for split-scope configuration, DHCP Server role migration using WSMT, support for DHCPv6 Option 15 (User Class) and Option 32 (Information Refresh Time). The DHCP server runs in the context of the Network Service account which has fewer privileges to reduce potential damage if compromised.

Windows Server 2008 R2 supports up to 64 physical processors or up to 256 logical processors per system. (Only the Datacenter and Itanium editions can take advantage of the capability of 64 physical processors. Enterprise, the next-highest edition after those two, can only use 8.) When deployed in a file server role, new File Classification Infrastructure services allow files to be stored on designated servers in the enterprise based on business naming conventions, relevance to business processes and overall corporate policies.

Server Core includes a subset of the .NET Framework, so that some applications (including ASP.NET web sites and Windows PowerShell 2.0) can be used.

Performance improvement was a major area of focus for this release; Microsoft has stated that work was done to decrease boot time, improve the efficiency of I/O operations while using less processing power, and generally improve the speed of storage devices, especially iSCSI.

Active Directory has several new features when raising the forest and domain functional levels to Windows Server 2008 R2: Two added features are Authentication Mechanism Assurance and Automatic SPN Management. When raising the forest functional level, the Active Directory recycle bin feature is available and can be enabled using the Active Directory Module for PowerShell.

== Support lifecycle ==
Support for the RTM version of Windows Server 2008 R2 ended on April 9, 2013. Users had to install Service Pack 1 to continue receiving updates.

On January 13, 2015, Windows Server 2008 R2 exited mainstream support and entered the extended support phase; Microsoft continued to provide security updates every month for Windows Server 2008 R2, however, free technical support, warranty claims, and design changes were no longer offered. Extended support ended on January 14, 2020, about ten years after the release of Windows Server 2008 R2.

In August 2019, researchers reported that "all modern versions of Microsoft Windows" may be at risk for "critical" system compromise due to design flaws of hardware device drivers from multiple providers.

=== Itanium ===
Microsoft announced that Server 2008 R2 would be the last version of Windows supporting the Itanium architecture, with extended support to end on July 10, 2018. However, monthly security updates continued until January 14, 2020, and a final unscheduled update appeared in May 2020 via WSUS.

=== Paid extended updates ===
Windows Server 2008 R2 was eligible for the paid ESU (Extended Security Updates) program. This program allowed volume license customers to purchase, in yearly installments, security updates for the operating system until January 10, 2023, only for Standard, Enterprise, and Datacenter volume licensed editions. The program was included with Microsoft Azure purchases, and offered Azure customers an additional year of support, until January 9, 2024.

Prior to the ESU program becoming available, Windows Server 2008 R2 was eligible for the now discontinued, paid Premium Assurance program (an add-on to Microsoft Software Assurance) available to volume license customers. However, Microsoft honored the program for customers who purchased it between March 2017 and July 2018 (while it was available). The program provided an extra six years of security update support. The Extended Security Updates program for Windows Server 2008 R2 ended on January 13, 2026, marking the final end of all security updates for the Windows NT 6.1 product line after 16 years, 5 months, and 22 days.

Paid extended updates were not available for Itanium customers.

== Service Pack ==
On February 9, 2011, Microsoft officially released Service Pack 1 (SP1) for Windows 7 and Windows Server 2008 R2 to OEM partners. Apart from bug fixes, it introduces two new major functions, RemoteFX and Dynamic Memory. RemoteFX enables the use of graphics hardware support for 3D graphics in a Hyper-V based VM. Dynamic Memory makes it possible for a VM to only allocate as much physical RAM as is needed temporarily for its execution. On February 16, SP1 became available for MSDN and TechNet subscribers as well as volume licensing customers. As of February 22, SP1 is generally available for download via the Microsoft Download Center and available on Windows Update.

== System requirements ==
System requirements for Windows Server 2008 R2 are as follows:

Processor
1.4 GHz x86-64 or Itanium 2 processor
Memory
Minimum: 512 MB RAM (may limit performance and some features)
Recommended: 2 GB RAM
Maximum: 8 GB RAM (Foundation), 32 GB RAM (Standard), or 2 TB RAM (Enterprise, Datacenter and Itanium)
Display
Super VGA (800×600) or higher
Disk Space Requirements
Minimum (editions higher than Foundation): 32 GB or more
Minimum (Foundation edition) 10 GB or more.
Computers with more than 16 GB of RAM require more disk space for paging and dump files.
Other
DVD drive, keyboard and mouse, Internet access (required for updates and online activation)

== Editions ==
Windows Server 2008 R2 edition comparison chart
Features	Foundation	Standard	Web	HPC	Enterprise	Datacenter	Itanium
Maximum RAM on x86-64	8 GB	32 GB		256 GB	2 TB		
Maximum physical CPUs	1	4			8	64	
Failover cluster nodes (Nodes)	—N/a	—N/a	—N/a	—N/a	16		8
Cross-file replication (DFS-R)	No	Yes	Yes	Yes	Yes	Yes	Yes
Fault tolerant memory sync	No	No	No	No	Yes	Yes	Yes
Memory modules: Hot addition	No	No	No	No	Yes	Yes	Yes
Memory modules: Hot replacement	No	No	No	No	No	Yes	Yes
CPUs: Hot addition	No	No	No	No	No	Yes	Yes
CPUs: Hot replacement	No	No	No	No	No	Yes	Yes
IAS connection	10	50	No	No	Unlimited	Unlimited	2
Remote Desktop Services connections	50	250	No	No	Unlimited	Unlimited	No
RRAS connections	50	250	No	250	Unlimited	Unlimited	No
Virtual image use rights	Forbidden	Host + 1 VM	1 VM	Host + 1 VM	Host + 4 VMs	Unlimited	Unlimited
Features	Foundation	Standard	Web	HPC	Enterprise	Datacenter	Itanium

== See also ==
- BlueKeep (security vulnerability)
- Comparison of Microsoft Windows versions
- Comparison of operating systems
- History of Microsoft Windows
- List of operating systems
- Microsoft Servers
