= Windows Server =

Group of server operating systems by Microsoft

- Developer: Microsoft
- Source model: Closed-source; Source-available (through Shared Source Initiative)
- Initial release: July 27, 1993; 33 years ago
- Latest release: Windows Server 2025 (10.0.26100) / 1 November 2024; 2 years ago
- Latest preview: vNext (10.0.29683) / October 12, 2026; 23 days ago
- Update method: Windows Update; Windows Server Update Services; Configuration Manager; Docker Hub; Intune
- Default user interface: Windows shell; PowerShell; Windows Admin Center
- License: Trialware, SaaS, or volume licensing
- Official website: www.microsoft.com/windows-server

Windows Server (formerly Windows NT Server) is a brand name for server-oriented releases of the Windows NT operating system (OS) that have been developed by Microsoft since 1993. The first release under this brand name is Windows NT 3.1 Advanced Server, an edition of Windows NT 3.1. With the release of Windows Server 2003, Microsoft started releasing new versions under the name Windows Server. The latest release of Windows NT under the Windows Server brand is Windows Server 2025.

Microsoft's history of developing operating systems for servers goes back to Windows NT 3.1 Advanced Server.

== History ==
=== Windows NT 3.x Server ===
Windows NT 3.1 Advanced Server was released on July 27, 1993 as an edition of Windows NT 3.1, an operating system aimed towards business and server use. As with its Workstation counterpart, Windows NT 3.1 Advanced Server was a 32 bit rewrite of the Windows kernel that retained a similar user interface to Windows 3.1. Unlike the latter, however, Windows NT 3.1 Advanced Server was a complete operating system that did not need to be run from DOS. Windows NT 3.1 Advanced Server, like its Workstation counterpart, featured new features such as multiuser support and preemptive multitasking. In 1994, Microsoft released Windows NT 3.5 Server. It introduced TCP/IP and Winsock support integrated into the operating system, alongside the ability to use FTP. It also supported VFAT.

In 1995, Microsoft released Windows NT 3.51 Server, an update to Windows NT 3.5 Server, which added NTFS compression and support for the PowerPC architecture.

=== Windows NT 4.0 Server ===
In 1996, Microsoft released Windows NT 4.0 Server. It added the new user interface introduced in Windows 95 the previous year. In addition, it dropped support for the PowerPC, Alpha, and MIPS architectures. Microsoft updated Winsock to version 2 and IIS 2.0 and FrontPage are included.

=== Windows 2000 Server ===
In 2000, Microsoft released Windows 2000 Server. It mainly introduced Active Directory.

=== Windows Server 2003 and 2003 R2 ===
Windows Server 2003 is based on Windows XP. It is the first server version to use the "Windows Server" brand name.

=== Windows Server 2008 and 2008 R2 ===
Windows Server 2008 is based on Windows Vista, while Windows Server 2008 R2 is based on Windows 7.

=== Windows Server 2012 and 2012 R2 ===
Windows Server 2012 is based on Windows 8, while Windows Server 2012 R2 is based on Windows 8.1.

=== Windows Server 2016, 2019 and 2022 ===
These versions of Windows Server are all based on Windows 10. Windows Server 2016 is based on Windows 10, version 1607, Windows Server 2019 is based on Windows 10, version 1809 and Windows Server 2022 is based on Windows 10, version 21H2.

=== Windows Server 2025 ===
This version of Windows Server is based on Windows 11, version 24H2.

== Members ==
=== Main releases ===
Main releases include:

- Windows NT 3.1 Advanced Server (July 27, 1993)
- Windows NT 3.5 Server (September 21, 1994)
- Windows NT 3.51 Server (May 30, 1995)
- Windows NT 4.0 Server (August 24, 1996)
- Windows 2000 Server (February 17, 2000)
- Windows Server 2003 (April 24, 2003)
- Windows Server 2003 R2 (March 5, 2006)
- Windows Server 2008 (February 27, 2008)
- Windows Server 2008 R2 (October 22, 2009)
- Windows Server 2012 (September 4, 2012)
- Windows Server 2012 R2 (October 17, 2013)
- Windows Server 2016 (October 12, 2016)
- Windows Server 2019 (October 2, 2018)
- Windows Server 2022 (August 18, 2021)
- Windows Server 2025 (November 1, 2024)

Traditionally, Microsoft supports Windows Server for 10 years, with five years of mainstream support and an additional five years of extended support. These releases also offer a complete desktop experience. Starting with Windows Server 2008, Server Core and Nano Server configurations were made available to reduce the OS footprint. Between 2015 and 2021, Microsoft referred to these releases as "long-term support" releases to set them apart from semi-annual releases (see below.)

For sixteen years, Microsoft released a major version of Windows Server every four years, with one minor version released two years after a major release. The minor versions had an "R2" suffix in their names. In October 2018, Microsoft broke this tradition with the release of Windows Server 2019, which would have been "Windows Server 2016 R2". Windows Server 2022 is also a minor upgrade over its predecessor.

=== Branded releases ===
Certain editions of Windows Server have a customized name:

- Windows Storage Server (editions of Windows Server 2003 through 2016; editions of Windows Server IoT 2019 and its successors)
- Windows HPC Server 2008
- Windows HPC Server 2008 R2
- Windows Home Server (an edition of Windows Server 2003)
- Windows Home Server 2011 (an edition of Windows Server 2008 R2)
- Hyper-V Server (a discontinued, freeware edition of Windows Server 2008 through 2019)
- Windows MultiPoint Server
- Windows Server Essentials
- Windows Essential Business Server (discontinued)
- Azure Stack HCI (an edition of Windows Server 2019 and later)

=== Semi-Annual releases (discontinued) ===
Following the release of Windows Server 2016, Microsoft attempted to mirror the lifecycle of Windows 10 in the Windows Server family, releasing new versions twice a year which were supported for 18 months. These semi-annual versions were only available as part of Microsoft subscription services, including Software Assurance, Azure Marketplace, and Visual Studio subscriptions, until their discontinuation in July 2021.

The semi-annual releases do not include any desktop environments. Instead, they are restricted to the Nano Server configuration installed in a Docker container, and the Server Core configuration, licensed only to serve as a container host.

Semi-Annual releases include:

- Windows Server, version 1709 (unsupported as of April 9, 2019; 7 years ago)
- Windows Server, version 1803 (unsupported as of November 12, 2019; 6 years ago)
- Windows Server, version 1809 (unsupported as of November 10, 2020; 5 years ago)
- Windows Server, version 1903 (unsupported as of December 8, 2020; 5 years ago)
- Windows Server, version 1909 (unsupported as of May 11, 2021; 5 years ago)
- Windows Server, version 2004 (unsupported as of December 14, 2021; 4 years ago)
- Windows Server, version 20H2 (unsupported as of August 9, 2022; 4 years ago)

=== Annual releases ===
The Annual Channel was first announced in July 2023, with the first version being released on September the same year. Unlike the Semi-Annual releases, each Annual Channel release would receive six months of extended support in addition to the 18 months of regular support. Annual releases are made available every twelve months, hence the name. Datacenter is the only edition available.

Annual releases include:

- Windows Server, version 23H2

== See also ==
- List of Microsoft Windows versions
- Microsoft Servers
- Linux range of use § Servers, mainframes and supercomputers
- NetWare
- Open Enterprise Server
