= System Center Operations Manager =

Data center monitoring system for operating systems

- Developer: Microsoft
- Stable release: 2025 UR1
- Operating system: Microsoft Windows
- Type: Network administration System monitor
- License: Trialware
- Website: docs.microsoft.com/en-us/system-center/scom/

System Center Operations Manager (SCOM) is an infrastructure-monitoring product in the Microsoft System Center family. It collects availability, performance, configuration and event data from Windows, Linux and Unix computers and presents health states and alerts through centralized consoles. Monitoring logic is packaged in reusable management packs for particular operating systems, applications and devices. The current release is System Center Operations Manager 2025 UR1.

== History ==
The product began as a network management system called SeNTry ELM, which was developed by the British company Serverware Group plc. In June 1998 the intellectual property rights were bought by Mission Critical Software, Inc. who renamed the product Enterprise Event Manager. Mission Critical undertook a complete rewrite of the product, naming the new version OnePoint Operations Manager (OOM). Mission Critical Software merged with NetIQ in early 2000, and sold the rights of the product to Microsoft in October 2000. It was later renamed into Microsoft Operations Manager (MOM) - in 2003, Microsoft began work on the next version of MOM: It was called Microsoft Operations Manager 2005 and was released in August 2004. Service Pack 1 for MOM 2005 was released in July 2005 with support for Windows 2003 Service Pack 1 and SQL Server 2000 Service Pack 4. It was also required to support SQL Server 2005 for the operational and reporting database components. The development for the next version—at this time its codename was “MOM V3”—began in 2005. Microsoft renamed the product System Center Operations Manager and released System Center Operations Manager 2007 in March 2007. System Center Operations Manager 2007 was designed from a fresh code base, and although sharing similarities to Microsoft Operations Manager, is not an upgrade from the previous versions.

=== 2009 ===
In May 2009 System Center Operations Manager 2007 had a so-called “R2” release - the general enhancement was cross platform support for UNIX and Linux servers. Instead of publishing individual service packs, bug fixes to the product after System Center Operations Manager 2007 R2 were released in the form of so-called cumulative updates (CUs).

== Architecture ==
Major components of System Center Operations Manager

The basic administrative unit in SCOM is a management group. A management group contains one or more management servers, an operational SQL Server database and a data-warehouse database. The operational database stores configuration and recent monitoring data, while the data warehouse retains longer-term information used for reporting. Multiple management servers can form resource pools so that monitoring work is redistributed if a server becomes unavailable.

An agent installed on a monitored computer collects events, performance counters and configuration data. It evaluates the health of monitored objects, can run diagnostic or recovery actions, and sends its results to a management server. Gateway servers proxy communications for computers in untrusted domains or across firewalls. Agentless monitoring can also be used for some network devices and systems on which an agent cannot be installed.

Management packs define discoveries, rules, monitors, tasks, dashboards and knowledge for a particular workload. The management server distributes the relevant workflows to agents and records the resulting health data and alerts. Microsoft and other vendors publish management packs, and administrators can author or tune their own for organization-specific applications.

== Integration with Microsoft Azure ==
To monitor servers which are running at Microsofts Cloud Infrastructure Azure it is possible to enable Log Analytics Data Sources which are collecting and sending their data to on premises SCOM Management Servers.

In November 2020 Microsoft announced the plan to make SCOM a fully cloud managed Instance at their Azure Environment, Codename was "Aquila".

== The Command Shell ==
Since Operations Manager 2007 the product includes an extensible command line interface called The Command Shell, which is a customized instance of the Windows PowerShell that provides interactive and script-based access to Operations Manager data and operations.

== Management Pack ==
SCOM can be extended by importing management packs (MPs) which define how SCOM monitors systems. By default, SCOM only monitors basic OS-related services, but new MPs can be imported to monitor services such as SQL servers, SharePoint, Apache, Tomcat, VMware and SUSE Linux.

Many Microsoft products have MPs that are released with them, and many non-Microsoft software companies write MPs for their own products as well.

Whilst a fair amount of IT infrastructure is monitored using currently available MPs, new MPs can be created by end-users in order to monitor what is not already covered.

Management Pack creation is possible with the System Center Operations Manager 2007 R2 Resource Kit, Visual Studio with Authoring Extensions and Visio MP Designer.

== Versions ==
Name	Update	Version	Release date
Microsoft Operations Manager 2000			2001
Microsoft Operations Manager 2005			2004
	Service Pack 1		2005 August 1
System Center Operations Manager 2007		6.0.5000.0	2007 March 23
	Service Pack 1	6.0.6278.0	2008 February 22
	R2	6.1.7221.0	
System Center Operations Manager 2012		7.0.8560.0	
	Service Pack 1	7.0.9538.0	
	R2	7.1.10226.0	2013 October 18
System Center Operations Manager 2016		7.2.11719.0	2016 September 26
	UR10	7.2.12324.0	
System Center Operations Manager 2019		10.19.10050.0	2019 March 14
	UR1	10.19.10311.0	2020 February 4
	UR2	10.19.10407.0	2020 August 4
	UR3	10.19.10505.0	2021 March 30
	UR3 - Hotfix		2021 October 19
System Center Operations Manager 2022		10.22.10118.0	2022 April 1
	UR1	10.22.10337.0	2023 January 24
System Center Operations Manager 2025		10.25.10324.0	1 November 2024
	UR1		2026

== See also ==
- Microsoft System Center
- Official SCOM Build Version List
- System Center Configuration Manager
- System Center Data Protection Manager
- System Center Virtual Machine Manager
- Microsoft Servers
- Oracle Enterprise Manager
- IBM Director

== Literature ==
- Fox, Chris (2006). Essential Microsoft Operations Manager. O'Reilly Media, Inc. ISBN 0-596-00953-4.
- Kerrie, Meyler; Fuller, Cameron; Joyner, John (10 March 2008). System Center Operations Manager 2007 Unleashed. Sams. ISBN 978-0-672-32955-5.
- Kerrie, Meyler; Fuller, Cameron; Joyner, John (2010). System Center Operations Manager 2007 R2 Unleashed. ISBN 978-0-672-33341-5.
- Kerrie, Meyler; Fuller, Cameron; Joyner, John (28 February 2013). System Center 2012 Operations Manager Unleashed (2nd ed.). Sams. ISBN 978-0-672-33591-4.
- Cornelissen, Bob; Keely, Paul; Greene, Kevin; Hadzhiyski, Ivan; Allen, Sam; Sampaio, Telmo (6 November 2012). Mastering System Center 2012 Operations Manager. John Wiley & Sons. ISBN 978-1-118-12899-2.
- Danny Hermans; Uwe Stürtz; Mihai Sarbulescu (10 April 2015). Microsoft System Center Operations Manager Field Experience. Microsoft Press. ISBN 978-0-7356-9587-0.
- Steve Beaumont (MVP); Jonathan Horner; Chiyo Odika (14 April 2015). Microsoft System Center 2012 R2 Operations Manager Cookbook. Packt Publishing Ltd. ISBN 978-1-78217-625-1.
- George Wallace; Bill May; Fred Lee (20 November 2014). Microsoft System Center Extending Operations Manager Reporting. Microsoft Press. ISBN 978-0-7356-9579-5.
