= Microsoft Servers =

Brand that encompasses Microsoft's server products

Logo

Microsoft Servers (previously called Windows Server System) is a discontinued brand that encompasses Microsoft software products for server computers. This includes the Windows Server editions of the Microsoft Windows operating system, as well as products targeted at the wider business market. Microsoft has since replaced this brand with Microsoft Azure, Microsoft 365 and Windows 365.

== Servers ==
=== Operating system ===
The Windows Server family of operating systems consists of Windows operating systems developed and licensed for use on server computers. This family started with Windows Server 2003, for which Microsoft released a major upgrade every four years and a minor upgrade every two years following a major release.

This family has branded members too, such as Windows Home Server, Windows HPC Server and Windows MultiPoint Server.

=== Windows components ===
The following products are shipped as Windows component, as opposed to standalone products.

- Internet Information Services (IIS): Web server, FTP server and basic email server
- Hyper-V: Bare-metal hypervisor
- Windows Services for UNIX
- Windows Server Update Services

=== Productivity ===
Some of the products included in the Windows Server System product branding are designed specifically for interaction with Microsoft Office. These include:

- BizTalk Server: Business process design and integration tools
- Exchange Server: E-mail and collaboration server
- Host Integration Server: Data and management connector between Windows environments and mainframe and midrange platforms such as IBM i. Formerly known as Microsoft SNA Server
- Project Server: Project management and resource allocation services; works as the server component to Microsoft Project
- SharePoint Server: Produces sites intended for collaboration, file sharing, web databases, social networking and web publishing.
- SQL Server: Relational Database Management and business intelligence server

=== Security ===
- Exchange Online Protection
- Identity Integration Server – Identity management product

== Microsoft System Center ==
Logo of Microsoft System Center

Microsoft System Center, a set of server products, aims specifically at helping corporate system administrators manage a network of Windows Server and client desktop systems.

- System Center Advisor: Software-as-a-service offering that helps change or assess the configuration of Microsoft Servers software over the Internet
- System Center App Controller: Unified management for public and private clouds, including cloud-based virtual machines and services
- System Center Capacity Planner: Provides purchasing and best-practice capacity planning guidance
- Microsoft Endpoint Configuration Manager: Configuration management, asset management, patch deployment tools for Windows desktops (previously Systems Management Server); includes Software Center.
- System Center Data Protection Manager: Continuous data protection and data recovery
- System Center Endpoint Protection: Anti-malware and security tools for Microsoft products
- System Center Essentials: Combined features of Operations Manager and Windows Software Update Services (WSUS), aimed at small and medium-sized businesses
- System Center Orchestrator (formerly Opalis): An automation platform for orchestrating and integrating administrative tools to decrease the cost of datacenter operations while improving the reliability of IT processes. It enables organizations to automate best practices, such as those found in Microsoft Operations Framework (MOF) and ITIL. Orchestrator operates through workflow processes that coordinate System Center and other management tools to automate incident response, change and compliance, and service-lifecycle management processes.
- System Center Operations Manager: Services and application monitoring
- System Center Service Manager: Ties in with SCOM, SCCM for asset tracking as well as incident, problem, change and configuration management (code name: Service Desk)
- System Center Virtual Machine Manager: Virtual-machine management and datacenter virtualization

== Discontinued server products ==
- Microsoft Application Center: Deployment of web applications across multiple servers. Some of its capabilities are now in System Center.
- Commerce Server: E-Commerce portal
  - Site Server (replaced by Commerce Server)
    - Merchant Server (replaced by Microsoft Site Server)
- Content Management Server: Web site content management and publishing. Merged into Microsoft SharePoint Server.
- Forefront: Comprehensive line of business security products
  - Threat Management Gateway: Firewall, routing, VPN and web caching server, formerly known as Microsoft ISA Server or Microsoft Proxy Server in its earlier iterations
    - Microsoft Proxy Server (replaced by Forefront Threat Management Gateway)
  - Protection for Exchange Server
  - Protection for SharePoint Server
  - Unified Access Gateway
  - Identity Manager
- Forms Server: Server-based electronic forms
- Groove Server: Collaboration server; works in conjunction with Microsoft SharePoint Workspace
- PerformancePoint Server: Business performance management server
- Project Portfolio Server
- Search Server
- Microsoft SNA Server (replaced by Host Integration Server)
- Skype for Business Server: Instant messaging and presence server, integration with telephone PBX systems. Integrates with Skype for Business.
- Speech Server: Speech applications for automated telephone systems, including voice recognition
- Virtual Server: Platform virtualization of operating systems
