= IP address management =

Method of computer network management

IP address management (IPAM) is a methodology implemented in computer software for planning and managing the assignment and use of IP addresses and closely related resources of a computer network. It does not typically provide Domain Name System (DNS) and Dynamic Host Configuration Protocol (DHCP) services, but manages information for these components. Additional functionality, such as controlling reservations in DHCP and other data aggregation and reporting capabilities, is also common. Data tracked by an IPAM system may include information such as IP addresses in use, and the associated devices and users. Centralized collection of this information may support troubleshooting and abuse investigations.

IPAM tools are increasingly important as new IPv6 networks are deployed with large address pools of 128-bit hexadecimal numbers and new subnetting techniques.
