= System Center Data Protection Manager =

- Developer(s): Microsoft
- Stable release: 2016 / October 2016
- Operating system: Windows Server
- Type: Near-continuous data protection, data recovery
- License: Trialware
- Website: microsoft.com/DPM

System Center Data Protection Manager (DPM) is a software product from Microsoft that provides near-continuous data protection and data recovery in a Microsoft Windows environment. It is part of the Microsoft System Center family of products and is Microsoft's first entry into the near-continuous backup and data recovery. It uses Shadow Copy technology for continuous backups.

== Overview ==
Data Protection Manager delivers centralized backup of branch offices and within the data center, by near-continuously protecting changed files at the byte-level to a secondary disk, which can then be backed up to tape. This also enables rapid and reliable recovery from an easily accessible disk instead of waiting to locate and mount tapes.

Data Protection Manager 2006 was released on September 27, 2005 at Storage Decisions in New York. The current version, Data Protection Manager 2019, supports protection of Windows file servers, Exchange Server, Microsoft SQL Server, SharePoint and Microsoft Virtual Server. It features bare-metal restore.

== Supported workloads ==
DPM offers support for a variety of Microsoft Workloads. Support varies between versions, with old operating systems being removed from new versions.

== See also ==
- Microsoft Servers
- Microsoft System Center
