= Microsoft Configuration Manager =

Server software for maintaining operating systems

- Other names: formerly Microsoft Endpoint Configuration Manager (ConfigMgr), System Center Configuration Manager (SCCM) and Systems Management Server (SMS)
- Developer: Microsoft
- Stable release: 2503 / 23 April 2025; 18 months ago
- Operating system: Microsoft Windows Server
- Platform: x64
- Type: Systems management
- Website: docs.microsoft.com/en-us/mem/configmgr/

Microsoft Configuration Manager (ConfigMgr) is a systems management software product developed by Microsoft for managing large groups of computers providing remote control, patch management, software distribution, operating system deployment, and hardware and software inventory management. Configuration Manager supports the Microsoft Windows and Windows IoT operating systems. Previous versions also supported macOS (OS X), Linux or UNIX, as well as Windows Phone, Symbian, iOS and Android mobile operating systems.

As per the latest release cadence, starting in the year 2023, customers will receive two releases of Configuration Manager per year, one in March (xx03), and another in September (xx09) rather than the previous release cadence of xx03, xx07, and xx11.

== History ==
Configuration Manager has evolved since Microsoft originally released it as "Systems Management Server" in 1994. Significant releases include:

- As Systems Management Server:
  - Systems Management Server 1.0, released in 1994 along with Windows NT Server 3.5. This initial release targeted the management of MS-DOS, Windows for Workgroups, Windows NT, Macintosh, and OS/2 desktops on Windows NT Server, NetWare, LAN Manager, and Pathworks networks.
  - Systems Management Server 1.1, released in 1995 to help customers migrate to Windows 95.
  - Systems Management Server 1.2, released in 1996 with new remote-control, SNMP, inventory, and network-monitoring capabilities.
  - Systems Management Server 2.0, released in 1999 to help with Y2K remediation efforts.
  - Systems Management Server 2003, released in 2003 with improved stability, reliability, and software-distribution capabilities.
- As Microsoft System Center Configuration Manager:
  - System Center Configuration Manager 2007, released in 2007 with support for Windows Vista and Windows Server 2008.
  - System Center Configuration Manager 2012, released in 2012 with significant changes to application deployment capabilities.
  - System Center Configuration Manager 1511, released in November 2015 to support Windows 10 and new Windows servicing options.
  - System Center Configuration Manager 1602, released March 11, 2016. New features include conditional access for PCs, Office 365 Update Management, greater management of mobile devices and of Windows 10.
  - System Center Configuration Manager 1606, released July 22, 2016. New features include support for managing new Windows 10 features like Windows Information Protection and Windows Defender Advanced Threat Protection, improved integration with the Windows Store for Business supporting online and offline-licensed apps, and more.
  - System Center Configuration Manager 1610, released in November 2016
  - System Center Configuration Manager 1702, released March 2017
  - System Center Configuration Manager 1706, released July 2017
  - System Center Configuration Manager 1710, released November 2017
  - System Center Configuration Manager 1802, released March 2018
  - System Center Configuration Manager 1806, released July 2018
  - System Center Configuration Manager 1810, released December 2018
  - System Center Configuration Manager 1902, released March 2019
  - System Center Configuration Manager 1906, released July 2019
- As Microsoft Endpoint Configuration Manager product suite:
  - Endpoint Configuration Manager 1910, released December 2019
  - Endpoint Configuration Manager 2002, released April 2020
  - Endpoint Configuration Manager 2006, released August 2020
  - Endpoint Configuration Manager 2010, released November 2020
  - Endpoint Configuration Manager 2103, released May 2021
  - Endpoint Configuration Manager 2107, released August 2021
  - Endpoint Configuration Manager 2111, released December 2021
  - Endpoint Configuration Manager 2203, released April 2022
  - Endpoint Configuration Manager 2207, released August 2022
  - Endpoint Configuration Manager 2211, released December 2022
- As Microsoft Configuration Manager product suite:
  - Configuration Manager 2303, released April 2023
  - Configuration Manager 2309, released October 2023
  - Configuration Manager 2403, released April 2024
  - Configuration Manager 2409, released December 2024
  - Configuration Manager 2503, released March 2025

SMS went through three major iterations:

- The 1.x versions of the product defined the scope of control of the management server (the site) in terms of the NT domain being managed.
- With the 2.x versions, that site paradigm switched to a group of subnets to be managed together.
- With SMS 2003 the site could also be defined as one or more Active Directory sites.

The most frequently used feature is a software deployment, which provides installation and updating of Windows Apps, legacy applications, and Operating Systems across a business enterprise.

SMS 2003 saw the introduction of the Advanced Client. The Advanced Client communicates with a more scalable management infrastructure, namely the Management Point. (A Management Point (MP) can manage up to 25000 Advanced Clients.) Microsoft introduced the Advanced Client to provide a solution to the problem where a managed laptop might connect to a corporate network from multiple locations and thus should not always download content from the same place within the enterprise (though it should always receive policy from its own site). When an Advanced Client is within another location (SMS Site), it may use a local distribution point to download or run a program, which can conserve bandwidth across a WAN.

== Components ==
- Policy Infrastructure
- Service Window Manager
- State System
- Center Configuration Manager Scheduler (CCM Scheduler)
- Center Configuration Manager Configuration Item Software Developers Kit (CCM CI SDK)
- Desired Configuration Management Agent (DCM Agent)
- Desired Configuration Management Reporting (DCM Reporting)
- MTC
- CI Agent
- CI Store
- CI Downloader
- CI Task Manager
- CI State Store
- Content Infrastructure
- Software Distribution
- Reporting
- Software Updates
- Operating System Deployment

== System requirements ==
The basic system requirements for Configuration Manager are variable and dependent on the scale of configuration.

== Product branding and naming ==
Microsoft Configuration Management has gone through two brand changes. Both resulted in reducing confusion with other initialism as well as including the software in a Microsoft systems management portfolio. In 2007, System Management Service (SMS) became System Center Configuration Manager (SCCM). This helped avoid confusion with the Short Message Service (SMS) initialism and added the product, along with other system management tools, under a unified System Center brand. In 2019 Configuration Manager moved to the Microsoft Endpoint Manager suite to better align it with Microsoft Intune and related endpoint management products. This change also helped reduce confusion of the oft-used initialism SCCM that is common in other industries such as The Society of Critical Care Medicine (SCCM). In 2023 the term "endpoint" was removed to rename the product to Microsoft Configuration Manager.

Throughout the life of the product, many acronyms, initialisms, and abbreviations have been used to refer to the software including

- SMS
- SCCM
- CM
- MECM
- MEMCM
- MCM
- ConfigMgr
- Config Man

However, Microsoft has stated and documented that the official name is one of the following

- Microsoft Configuration Manager
- Configuration Manager
- ConfigMgr

== See also ==
- Microsoft Servers
- Microsoft Intune
- Microsoft System Center
  - Data Protection Manager
  - Operations Manager
  - Virtual Machine Manager
- Configuration management
- Windows Server Update Services
- SYDI
