= Jim Jagielski =

American software engineer (born 1961)

- Born: Dundalk, Maryland, US
- Education: Johns Hopkins University
- Occupation: software engineer
- Board member of: Apache Software Foundation Director, 1999-2019, 2025; Open Source Initiative Director, 2010-2013; Outercurve Foundation Director, 2009-present
- Website: www.jimjag.com

Jim Jagielski is an American software engineer who was a co-founder of the Apache Software Foundation, specializing in Open Source, InnerSource, web and cloud technologies.

== Professional activity ==
While at NASA/Goddard, he served as editor of the A/UX FAQ and system administrator for Jagubox, the primary repository for third-party software for Apple's A/UX operating system. It was at this time that Jagielski started actively contributing to numerous Internet software projects, such as BIND, sendmail, xntpd, etc. as he ported these core technologies to the A/UX platform. He continues as an active Open Source developer to this day.

In 1994, Jagielski founded jaguNET Access Services, a web host and ISP. He has served as CTO for Zend Technologies. Additionally, Jagielski has served as the Open Source Program Office lead for companies such as Red Hat, Capital One, VMWare, Uber, and currently Salesforce.

Jagielski is a frequent speaker and keynoter at past and present Open Source related conferences, including OSCON, ApacheCon, OSSF, Open Expo Europe, FOSS Backstage, OW2Con Open Source 101 and All Things Open.

=== Apache Software Foundation ===
After doing some development on the NCSA HTTPd web server, he started with Apache in early-to-mid 1995. Jagielski is one of the co-founders of the Apache Software Foundation and served for over 25 years as director, chairman, president, and executive vice-president of the ASF. Jagielski is the original Chair of the Apache Incubator project.

=== Other board and council memberships ===
In 2010, Jagielski was appointed to the board of directors of the CodePlex Foundation, which was later renamed to Outercurve Foundation. Jagielski also serves as the president for Outercurve.

In 2011, Jagielski was appointed to the Board of Directors of the Open Source Initiative. He resigned in September 2013. The following year, Jagielski was appointed as a new Council member of the MARSEC-XL Foundation. Jagielski is a member of OASIS Open's Open Projects Advisory Council.

== Awards ==
Jagielski was one of the recipients of the O'Reilly Open Source Awards at OSCON 2012.

In 2015, Jagielski was awarded the European Commission/Open Innovation Strategy and Policy Group's Luminary Award in Creating Open Engagement Platforms for his global efforts in promoting Open Source as an Innovation process..

At the 2025 All Things Open conference, Jagielski was awarded the inaugural Open Source Icon award for his decades-long service to the Open Source community.
