= Windows Notepad =

Simple text editor included with Microsoft Windows

- Notepad on Windows 11
- Original author: Richard Brodie
- Developer: Microsoft
- Release: 1983; 43 years ago (as Multi-Tool Notepad)

Stable release(s) [±]
- Windows 11: July 2026 Update (11.2607.14) / September 2, 2026; 56 days ago
- Windows 10, discontinued: 10.0 (Build 19041.5794) / April 14, 2025; 18 months ago
- Operating system: Windows 11
- Platform: IA-32, x86-64, and ARM (historically Itanium, DEC Alpha, MIPS, and PowerPC)
- Included with: All Microsoft Windows versions
- Predecessor: MS-DOS Editor
- Type: Text editor
- License: Freeware
- Website: apps.microsoft.com/detail/9msmlrh6lzf3

Windows Notepad (commonly known simply as Notepad) is a simple text editor for Windows; it creates and edits plain text documents. It was first released in 1983 to commercialize the computer mouse in MS-DOS, replacing the legacy MS-DOS Editor.

== History ==
In May 1983, at the COMDEX computer expo in Atlanta, Microsoft introduced the Multi-Tool Notepad, a mouse-based text editor Richard Brodie had created as a stripped down version of Multi-Tool Word. Notepad had the ability to bold, underline or italicise text removed. All these programs were to support the release of the $195 Microsoft Mouse, with the mouse including Notepad or Word, sometimes both, depending on the date. Most visitors had never heard of a computer mouse before. The mouse began shipping in July. Initial sales were modest because it had no use other than running the programs included in the box (a tutorial, a Doodle drawing app, a musical piano app, Multi-Tool Notepad and/or Multi-tool Word.)

The Multi-Tool product line began with expert systems for the Multiplan spreadsheet. On the suggestion of Rowland Hanson, Microsoft dropped the Multi-Tool brand name. Hanson's rationale was that "the brand is the hero" and people wouldn't automatically associate "Multi-Tool" with Microsoft. As a result, the Multi-Tool Notepad and the Multi-Tool Word became Windows Notepad and Microsoft Word, respectively. (Hanson also convinced Bill Gates to rename "Interface Manager" to "Windows" before the release of Windows 1.0.)

Since then, Notepad has been part of Microsoft Windows.

=== Change in development model ===
Since the introduction of Microsoft Store in 2012, Microsoft has converted some of the built-in Windows apps into Microsoft Store apps (e.g., Sticky Notes), so that they could be updated independent of Windows releases. Within three years, Notepad has appeared on Microsoft Store thrice. The first time was in August 2019; it vanished shortly thereafter. This version required Windows 10 preview build 18963. During this short-lived presence on the Store, technology news blogs speculated that Microsoft intended to de-couple Notepad's life-cycle from that of Windows 10 and update it more frequently through Microsoft Store. Notepad appeared on Microsoft Store for a second time in April 2020, this time, featuring a new logo. It runs on the preview versions of Windows 10, build number 19541 or later.

On 16 February 2022, Microsoft started rolling out a new and redesigned version of Notepad to all Windows 11 users. This version had dark mode added and a new "find and replace" flyout with the same functionality. Notepad is now available in the Microsoft Store in both Windows 10 and 11.

On March 21, 2024, Microsoft announced that it is adding spellcheck and autocorrect to Notepad for Windows 11.

On November 6, 2024, Microsoft announced that rewriting tools powered by LLMs will be added to Notepad. Users will be able to rewrite selected text, adjust its length and modify its tone and format, similar to Grammarly's AI writing features.

The new features are available to Windows Insider members in the Canary and Dev Channels and will be available to all Windows 11 users at a later time.

== Features ==
Notepad is a text editor, i.e., an app specialized in editing plain text. It can edit text files (bearing the ".txt" filename extension) and compatible formats, such as batch files, INI files, and log files.

Notepad offers only the most basic text manipulation functions, such as finding and replacing text. Until Windows ME, there were almost no keyboard shortcuts and no line-counting feature. Starting with Windows 2000, shortcuts for common commands like "New", "Open", and "Save" were added, as well as a status bar with a line counter (available only when word-wrap is disabled). Before Windows 10 version 1809, Notepad could not properly interpret either Unix-style or Mac-style newline characters. Windows 10 version 1809 also introduced the Ctrl+← Backspace keyboard shortcut (deletes the previous word), zoom functionality, the ability to zoom in and out, and the "Search with Bing" function.

Improving performance has been the main focus of Notepad's development. As part of this effort, Notepad is capable of reading text files even when other apps have acquired a range-based lock on the file.

On Windows 95 and earlier, Notepad renders text files in the Fixedsys font. Starting with Windows NT 4.0 and Windows 98, it allows users to choose their own font to display the text. They cannot, however, select individual parts of the text and change their fonts. Its default font changed to Lucida Console on Windows 2000, and Consolas on Windows 8.

Notepad can print files. It allows customizing headers, footers, and margins before printing. The date, file name, and other information can be placed in the headers and footers with various codes consisting of an ampersand ('&') followed by a letter.

Notepad accepts text from the Windows clipboard, but only in the CF_TEXT format. It strips the pasted text of any embedded font and style information. One could temporarily paste formatted text into Notepad, then immediately copy it again to obtain the raw text.

Notepad has a simple logging function. Each time it opens a file with ".LOG" on its first line, the app inserts a timestamp on the file's last line.

Simple Markdown support was added in 2025.

=== Encoding support ===
Notepad supports the following character encodings:

- "ANSI" (the locale-dependent codepage)
- Unicode, encoded as:
  - UCS-2 (Windows NT 3.5 to 2000)
  - UTF-16 (Windows 2000 or later), both little- and big-endian
  - UTF-8 (Windows 2000 or later)
    - Before Windows 10, Notepad always inserted a byte order mark character at the start of the file. Since Windows 10, the BOM has been optional.

Starting with Windows 10 1809 Insider build, it supports Unix-style (LF) and Classic Mac OS -style (CR) line endings, along with the native DOS/Windows CRLF style. Before this, only CRLF line endings were recognized.

Opening and editing in left-to-right and right-to-left based languages are done via RichEdit controls and input method editors, available in versions for Windows XP or later.

== Limitations ==
Notepad used a built-in window class named EDIT. The maximum file size Notepad can open depends on operating system limitations on the size of the EDIT window class, with a different limit in each version of Windows. Because of this limitation, on Windows 3.0, Windows 3.1, and Windows 3.11, Notepad could not open files larger than 54 KB. (Microsoft recommended using another text editor for opening files larger than 45 KB.) This limit was extended to 64 KB in Windows 95, with users now directed to WordPad for larger files. On Windows XP, Notepad was limited to 32 MB and declined to open bigger files. On Windows 11, Notepad uses the RichEdit control. The size limit was raised to about 1 GB, and attempting to open any file larger than that shows a dialog box suggesting that the user open it with a different text editor.

=== Unicode detection ===
On the Windows NT family of operating systems (including Windows 2000 and Windows XP), Notepad can detect Unicode files even when they lack a byte order mark. To do this, it calls the IsTextUnicode() function of the Windows API. Until Windows Vista, this function was imperfect, incorrectly identifying some all-lowercase ASCII text as UTF-16. As a result, Notepad interpreted a file containing a phrase like "aaaa aaa aaa aaaaa" ("4-3-3-5") as a two-byte-encoded Unicode text file. If a font with support for Chinese was installed, nine Chinese characters (桴獩愠灰挠湡戠敲歡) would display. Otherwise, it would display square substitute characters instead of Chinese characters. This issue was resolved on Windows Vista and newer.

== Competing software ==
Notepad lacks many basic features available in other text editors, such as block selection and until recently MDI, Notepad now supports a tabbed interface that allows opening and switching between documents in different tabs, also now retains information typed into open tabs on closing the application. There are many third-party replacements for Notepad with additional functionality, such as AkelPad, Metapad, Notepad++, Notepad2, and TED Notepad, which include features such as, but not limited to:

- undo history
- syntax coloring
- code folding
- regular expressions
- macros
- manual code page selection
- themes
- sorting
- case changes
- external change detection
- matching braces
- visible line-endings and visible line-wrap indication
- line numbering, splitting and joining
- automatic indentation
- mass-editing of lines
- blank line removal
- hard alignment (using whitespace characters)
- whitespace stripping
- running in portable mode

== See also ==
- MS-DOS Editor
- XML Notepad
