= Conference XP =

Free video-conferencing software

ConferenceXP
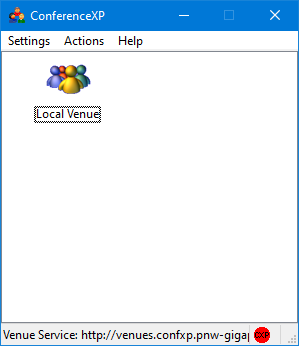
- ConferenceXP 5.3.2
- Developers: Microsoft Research, University of Washington, Outercurve Foundation
- Stable release: 5.3.2 / August 6, 2013; 12 years ago
- Repository: github.com/conferencexp/conferencexp
- Written in: C#
- Operating system: Windows XP or later
- Platform: .NET Framework
- Available in: English
- Type: Video conferencing
- License: Apache License 2.0
- Website: cct.cs.washington.edu

ConferenceXP is a free and open source video conferencing platform designed to address the needs of academic distance learning / multi-institutional instruction and advanced collaboration scenarios.

== Overview ==
ConferenceXP is intended to be both a tool for end users and a platform for developing solutions for specific vertical applications as well as distributed applications. It supports advanced capabilities including: handwriting and 'ink' input through Tablet PCs; high definition video sharing up to 1080p (Full HD); and desktop conferencing via USB and IEEE 1394 cameras. ConferenceXP was originally conceived in 2001 by the Microsoft Research Learning Science and Technology team and released under a shared source license.

In July 2007 Microsoft Research External Research and Programs announced the funding of the Center for Collaborative Technologies at the University of Washington for a duration of 3 years. The primary mission of the Center was to continue development and deployment support for ConferenceXP.

In December 2010, both Microsoft and the University of Washington assigned rights to the Outercurve Foundation, and a new open-source license was applied, the Apache License 2.0. After the transition to open source, the University of Washington continues to support the main ConferenceXP Website, and the source code repository for the project, and will act as central point of contact for contributors to the project.

== Higher Education Involvement ==
The following Universities in the United States and Ireland have been involved in research, development and/or innovative deployment with ConferenceXP:

- Northern Illinois University
- Brown University
- Cornell University
- Indiana University – Purdue University Indianapolis - (IUPUI) - The Donald Tavel Arts and Technology Lab
- University of California, Berkeley
- University of Washington
- University of California, Santa Cruz
- University of Nebraska–Lincoln
- National University of Ireland, Galway
- University of Massachusetts
- Boston University
- University of Sydney
- Texas Christian University

There are other institutions which have invested resources in development on this platform:

- University of Michigan (School of Public Health)
- Merit Network (MERIT)
- University of Rochester (Eastman School of Music)

== The platform ==
ConferenceXP is a platform supporting applications and services for low-latency, high fidelity conferencing applications. A complete description of the architecture and services available is available through the ConferenceXP website. Jay Beavers from Microsoft was the architect and lead developer for the ConferenceXP platform.

Given the n-way nature of multi-party conferencing, the platform is optimised for use on multicast networks, generally supported by academic, government and research networks like Internet2 rather than the commodity Internet. However, Reflector Services accommodate unicast clients in ConferenceXP multicast sessions. The only publicly available reflectors current reside on the Pacific Northwest Gigapop (University of Washington) and at the Northern Illinois University School of Music.

One of the most notable applications is Classroom Presenter developed by a team of researchers at University of Washington, led by Richard Anderson.

== See also ==
- Distance education
- Video conferencing
- Internet2
- Multicast
