= Shared Source Common Language Infrastructure =

Shared Source Common Language Infrastructure (SSCLI)
- Developer: Microsoft
- Release: March 2002; 24 years ago
- Stable release: March 23, 2006; 20 years ago / 2.0
- Written in: C#, JavaScript, C++, C
- Type: Software framework
- License: Microsoft Shared Source Common Language Infrastructure license
- Website: msdn.microsoft.com/msdnmag/issues/02/07/SharedSourceCLI/
- Repository: github.com/SSCLI

The Shared Source Common Language Infrastructure (SSCLI), previously codenamed Rotor, is Microsoft's shared source implementation of the CLI, the core of .NET. Although the SSCLI is not suitable for commercial use due to its license, it does make it possible for programmers to examine the implementation details of many .NET libraries and to create modified CLI versions. Microsoft provides the Shared Source CLI as a reference CLI implementation suitable for educational use.

== History ==
Beginning in 2001, Microsoft announced they would release part of the .NET Framework infrastructure source code in Shared source through ECMA, as part of the C# and CLI standardization process.

In March 2002, Microsoft released version 1.0 of the Shared Source Common Language Infrastructure, also called Rotor. The Shared Source CLI was initially pre-configured to run on Windows, but could also be built on FreeBSD (version 4.7 or newer), and Mac OS X 10.2. It was designed such that the only thing that needed to be customized to port the Shared Source CLI to a different platform was a thin Platform Abstraction Layer (PAL).

The last 2.0 version of SSCLI was released in March 2006, and contains most of the classes and features of version 2.0 of the .NET Framework. SSCLI 2.0 can be downloaded directly from Microsoft downloads and requires Perl and Visual Studio 2005 running on Windows XP SP2 to compile. Microsoft has not updated the source and build requirements since 2006. Even Microsoft MVPs, important part of Microsoft community ecosystem, complained about the lack of support for other Visual Studio versions and operating systems. However, a non-official patch for Visual Studio 2008 was provided by a Microsoft employee in the MSDN Blog and another for Visual Studio 2010 was released by the community.

Later versions of .NET, originally known as .NET Core and now referred to simply as .NET, have been open sourced under the more permissive MIT license.

== License ==
The Shared Source CLI use the non-free Microsoft Shared Source Common Language Infrastructure license. This license allows modifications and redistribution of the code for personal or academic usages, but they can't be used for commercial products.

== See also ==
- Microsoft and open source
- Common Language Runtime
- .NET
- Mono
- DotGNU
