= .NET Foundation =

Microsoft organization for .NET

- Founded: March 31, 2014; 12 years ago
- Founder: Microsoft
- Tax ID no.: 47-2119192
- Legal status: 501(c)(6) organization
- Headquarters: Redmond, Washington, U.S.
- Website: dotnetfoundation.org

The .NET Foundation is an organization incorporated on March 31, 2014, by Microsoft to improve open-source software development and collaboration around the .NET Framework. It was launched at the annual Build 2014 conference held by Microsoft. The foundation is license-agnostic, and projects that come to the foundation are free to choose any open-source license, as defined by the Open Source Initiative (OSI). The foundation uses GitHub to host the open-source projects it manages.

Anyone who has contributed to .NET Foundation projects can apply to be a .NET Foundation member. Members can vote in elections for the board of the directors and will preserve the health of the organization.

The foundation began with twenty-four projects under its stewardship including .NET Compiler Platform ("Roslyn") and the ASP.NET family of open-source projects, both open-sourced by Microsoft Open Technologies, Inc. (MS Open Tech). Xamarin contributed six of its projects including the open source email libraries MimeKit and MailKit. As of August 2026, it is the steward of 556 active projects, including: .NET, Entity Framework (EF), Managed Extensibility Framework (MEF), MSBuild, NuGet, Orchard CMS and WorldWide Telescope. Many of these projects are also listed under Outercurve Foundation project galleries.

As of July 2026, its board of directors consisted of Mitchel Sellers (President), Jonathan Tower (Vice President), Lou Creemers, Chris Woodruff, Irina Dominte, Peter Smulovics, Hayden Barnes, Meagon Hansen, and Chris Sfanos (Founding Member Representative).

== See also ==
- Free software movement
- ASP.NET AJAX
- ASP.NET MVC
- SignalR
- .NET Micro Framework
