= XML Notepad =

XML editor developed by Microsoft

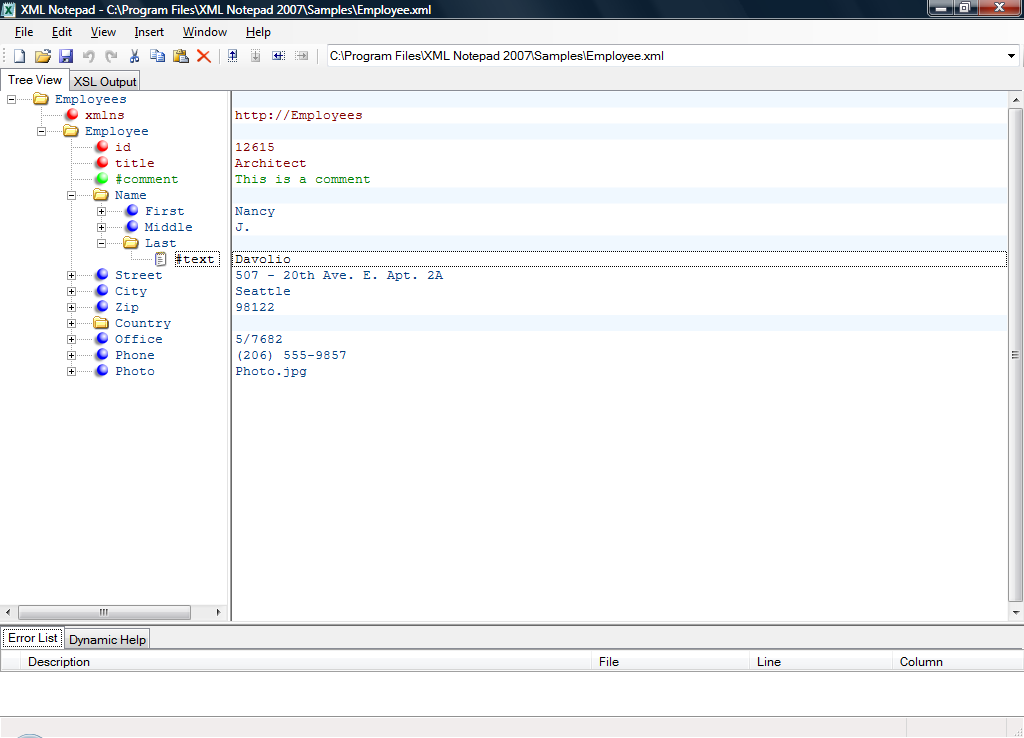
- XML Notepad 2007
- Original authors: Chris Lovett, Michael Corning, Dan Doris
- Developer: Microsoft
- Initial release: 1 September 2006; 19 years ago
- Stable release: 2.9.0.21 / 28 March 2026; 60 days ago
- Written in: C#
- Operating system: Windows 2000 and later
- Platform: .NET Framework
- Available in: English
- Type: XML editor
- License: MIT License
- Website: microsoft.github.io/XmlNotepad/
- Repository: github.com/microsoft/xmlnotepad

XML Notepad is an open-source XML editor written by Chris Lovett and published by Microsoft. The editor features incremental search in both tree and text views, drag/drop support, IntelliSense, find/replace with regular expressions and XPath expressions, and support for XInclude. The editor has good performance on large XML documents and has real time XML schema validation. The editor also features an HTML viewer for displaying XSLT transformation results and a built-in XML comparison tool.

The program's source code was made available on CodePlex on 20 April 2007, and moved to GitHub in April 2016.

== History ==
The original XML Notepad was written in 1998 by Murray Low in C++, but was eventually removed from Microsoft Developer Network (MSDN) due to its lack of support for modern XML standards and no maintenance. However, because of high demand, a replacement was written in C# by Chris Lovett using the System.Xml library of the .NET Framework 2.0.

XML Notepad 2007 was released eight months after the release of XML Notepad 2006. The new version featured several bug fixes, Windows Vista compatibility and updated Aero-style computer icons.

XML Notepad 2.6 was released in 2014 containing various bug fixes reported by community on codeplex. It was also updated to use .NET Framework 4.0. According to the Codeplex Web site it moved in 2016 to GitHub.

== See also ==
- HTML editor
- XMLSpy
- Microsoft Notepad
