= Azure Linux =

Microsoft open source operating system

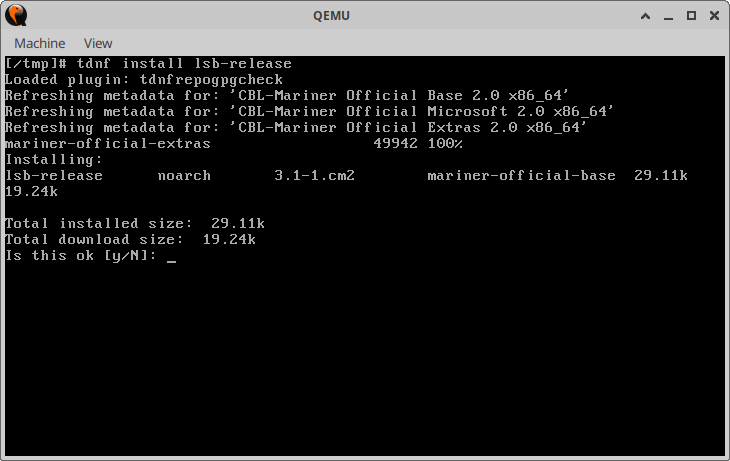
- Developer: Microsoft
- Written in: Go, Shell script, C, Roff, Python
- OS family: Linux
- Source model: Open source
- Initial release: April 1, 2020; 6 years ago (as CBL-Mariner)
- Latest release: 4.0 / July 1, 2026
- Repository: github.com/microsoft/azurelinux
- Marketing target: Cloud infrastructure and edge products and services
- Kernel type: Monolithic (Linux kernel)
- License: Primarily MIT License, with some components under Apache License v2, GPLv2, and LGPLv2.1
- Official website: aka.ms/azurelinux

Azure Linux (previously CBL-Mariner), is a free and open-source Linux distribution developed by Microsoft and, starting with v4.0, based on Fedora Linux. It is the base container OS for Microsoft Azure services and the graphical component of WSL 2.

== Overview ==
Azure Linux is being developed by the Linux Systems Group at Microsoft for its edge network services and as part of its cloud infrastructure. The company uses it as the base Linux for containers in the Azure Stack HCI implementation of Azure Kubernetes Service. Microsoft also uses Azure Linux in Azure IoT Edge to run Linux workloads on Windows IoT, and as a backend distro to host the Weston compositor for WSLg.

In a similar approach to Fedora CoreOS, Azure Linux only has the basic packages needed to support and run containers. Common Linux tools are used to add packages and manage security updates. Updates are offered either as RPM packages or as complete disk images that can be deployed as needed. Using RPM allows adding custom packages to a base Azure Linux image to support additional features and services as needed. Notable features include an iptables-based firewall, support for signed updates, and a hardened kernel.

Microsoft released the operating system in 2020. Its source code is available on GitHub, mainly under the MIT License, with some components under Apache License v2, GPLv2, and LGPLv2.1. Building Azure Linux requires the Go programming language, QEMU utilities, and RPM.

Starting from the release 2.0.20240301, Azure Linux was renamed from CBL-Mariner (Common Base Linux Mariner).

Starting with version 4.0, Azure Linux is officially based on Fedora Linux.

== See also ==
- SONiC (operating system)
- Windows Subsystem for Linux
- Azure Sphere
