= Vcpkg =

Open source package manager

vcpkg
- Developer: Microsoft
- Release: 2016; 10 years ago
- Stable release: 2026.07.29 / July 31, 2026; 54 days ago
- Written in: C++
- Operating system: Windows (11, 10, 8.1, 7), macOS, Linux
- Platform: IA-32, x86-64, ARM32, ARM64
- Type: Package manager
- License: MIT License
- Website: vcpkg.io
- Repository: github.com/microsoft/vcpkg

vcpkg is a cross-platform open source C/C++ package manager by Microsoft.

== Overview ==
vcpkg provides access to C and C++ libraries to its supported platforms. The command-line utility is currently available on Windows, macOS and Linux.

The vcpkg source code is licensed under MIT License and hosted on GitHub.

== Integrated development environment ==
vcpkg supports Visual Studio 2015 Update 3 and above.

In early 2023, JetBrains CLion began supporting vcpkg directly—adding a tool‑window, package browser, install/update actions, vcpkg.json integration, and quick‑fixes for missing packages.

== History ==
vcpkg was first announced at CppCon 2016.

In 2018, Microsoft announced the availability of this installer for Mac and Linux, among other POSIX systems.

The 2024.01.12 release (January 2024) added 15 new ports (total 2,377), 227 updates, numerous documentation articles—including SBOM support—and refined triplet implementation.

In early 2025, monthly updates continued: tool/releases in January–April including documentation additions, CI commands, performance improvements, offline usage support, Arm64 Linux support, and other bug fixes.

As of December 2025, there are 2732 libraries supported by the vcpkg package installer.

== See also ==
- List of software package management systems
