= Adoptium =

Computer program

Eclipse Adoptium
- Predecessor: AdoptOpenJDK
- Formation: March 23, 2021
- Purpose: To produce high-quality runtimes and associated technology for use within the Java ecosystem
- Parent organization: Eclipse Foundation
- Website: adoptium.net

The Eclipse Adoptium (/əˈdɒptiəm/) Working Group is the successor of AdoptOpenJDK.

The main goal of Adoptium is to promote and support free and open-source high-quality runtimes and associated technology for use across the Java ecosystem. To do so the Adoptium Working Group (WG) builds and provides OpenJDK based binaries under the Eclipse Temurin project. In addition to Temurin the WG creates an open test suite for OpenJDK based binaries as part of the Eclipse AQAvit project.

The Adoptium Working Group was launched by Alibaba Cloud, Huawei, IBM, iJUG, Karakun AG, Microsoft, New Relic, and Red Hat in March 2021.

In May 2022, the Adoptium project announced the formation of the Adoptium Marketplace.

== Projects ==
=== Eclipse Temurin ===
Eclipse Temurin JDK
- Developer: Eclipse Adoptium

Stable release(s) [±]
- Java 25: 25.0.3 (Build 9) / April 22, 2026; 23 days ago
- Java 21: 21.0.11 (Build 10) / April 23, 2026; 22 days ago
- Java 17: 17.0.19 (Build 10) / April 22, 2026; 23 days ago
- Java 11: 11.0.31 (Build 11) / April 28, 2026; 17 days ago
- Java 8: 8u492 (Build 9) / May 4, 2026; 11 days ago
- Written in: Java, C++, C
- Operating system: Windows 10, 11; Windows Server 2019+; macOS 12+; IBM AIX; Red Hat Enterprise Linux; SUSE Linux Enterprise; Ubuntu; Alpine Linux; Discontinued: Oracle Solaris
- Type: Software development kit
- Website: adoptium.net
- Repository: github.com/adoptium/adoptium

The Eclipse Temurin project produces Temurin (/ˈtɛmjərɪn/), a certified binary build of OpenJDK. The initial release in October 2021 supported Java LTS 8, and 11. The name for the project, Temurin, is an anagram of the word runtime. Since 2023 the Adoptium Working Group members Azul Systems, IBM, Open Elements and Red Hat have offered commercial support for Temurin.

== History ==
Eclipse Adoptium originally started as AdoptOpenJDK. AdoptOpenJDK was founded in 2017 and provided enterprises with free and open-source Java runtimes.

In 2020, AdoptOpenJDK moved to the Eclipse Foundation project under the name Eclipse Adoptium. The working group produces binaries via the Eclipse Temurin project.

== Members ==
As of July 2023, there are 12 members:

- Alibaba Cloud
- Azul Systems
- Bloomberg L.P.
- Canonical
- Google
- Huawei
- IBM
- iJUG: Interessenverbund der Java User Groups e.V.
- Open Elements
- Microsoft
- New Relic
- Red Hat
