= Python Tools for Visual Studio =

Open source software plug-in

Python Tools for Visual Studio (PTVS)
- Developer: Microsoft
- Initial release: March 8, 2011; 14 years ago
- Stable release: 2.2.6 / January 13, 2017; 8 years ago
- Repository: github.com/microsoft/PTVS
- Written in: C#, Python
- Operating system: Microsoft Windows
- Type: Integrated development environment
- License: Apache License 2.0
- Website: visualstudio.microsoft.com/vs/features/python/

Python Tools for Visual Studio (PTVS) is a free and open-source plug-in for versions of Visual Studio up to VS 2015 providing support for programming in Python. Since VS 2017, it is integrated in VS and called Python Support in Visual Studio. It supports IntelliSense, debugging, profiling, MPI cluster debugging, mixed C++/Python debugging, and more. It is released under the Apache License 2.0, and is developed primarily by Microsoft.

The first version was on March 8, 2011. The latest version for VS 2015 is 2.2.6.

== See also ==
- Comparison of integrated development environments § Python
- List of Python software
- R Tools for Visual Studio
