= Open Source Summit =

Convention organized by the Linux Foundation

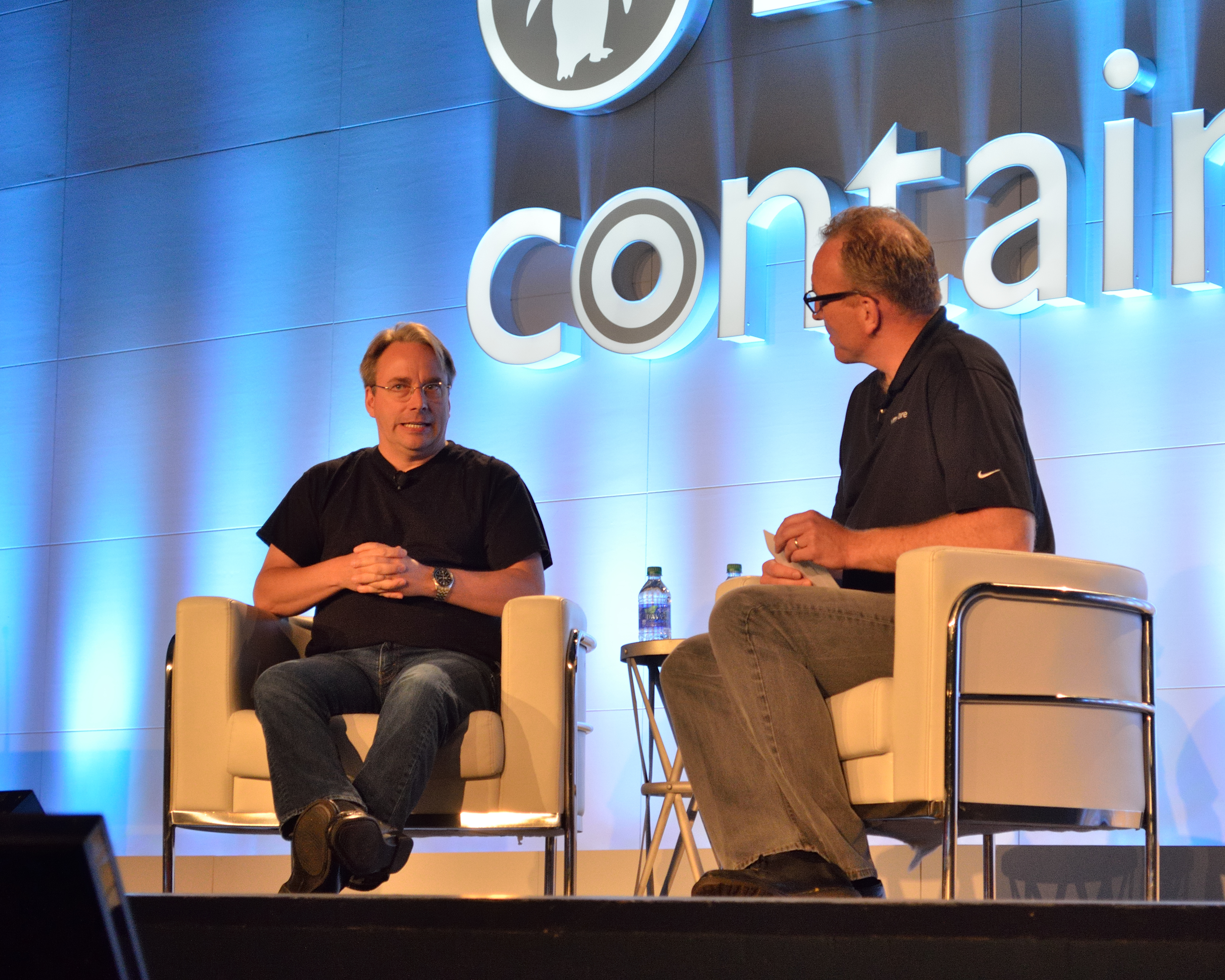
Linus Torvalds at Linuxcon North America 2016

Open Source Summit (formerly LinuxCon) is a name for a series of annual conventions organized each year since 2009 by the Linux Foundation. The first LinuxCon took place in North America. Linux Foundation started organizing similar events in Europe and Japan. The original LinuxCon was rebranded LinuxCon North America, adding to the list LinuxCon Europe and LinuxCon Japan.

Apart from keynotes given by some high-profile Linux people (such as Linus Torvalds or Greg Kroah-Hartman in 2009), Open Source Summit is increasingly used as a platform for open source thought leaders, influencers, hiring managers, professionals, and developers in information technology to talk about their plans for the technological landscape and announce major news. For example, Nokia confirmed in 2010 the delivering of the first MeeGo device this same year, or Oracle Corporation explained in 2010 where they were heading for their Linux efforts after their acquisition of Sun Microsystems. Uber and Lyft announced a de facto collaboration on Cloud Native Computing Foundation projects at Open Source Summit North America in 2017.

== Rebranding as Open Source Summit ==
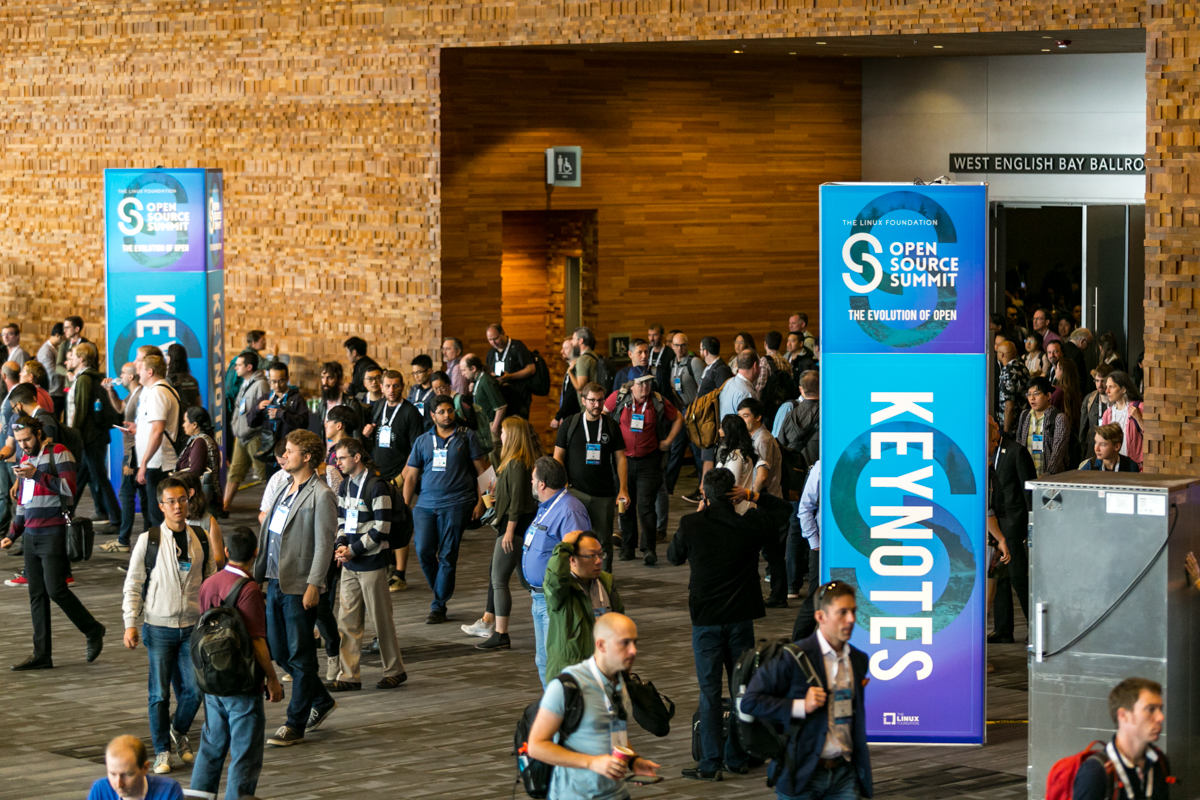
Open Source Summit North America 2018, held in Vancouver

At the end of LinuxCon North America event in Toronto, Ontario, Canada in 2016, it was announced that the event would be re-branded to be more representative of the organization/event's more general open source audience in 2017. As such, LinuxCon has been replaced with an event called Open Source Summit in 2017 in North America, Europe and Japan.

== History ==
LinuxCon 2009
Held on 21–23 September 2009 in Portland.
LinuxCon North America 2010
Held on 10–12 August 2010 in Boston.
LinuxCon Brazil 2010
Held on August 31 - September 1, 2010 in São Paulo.
LinuxCon Japan 2010
Held on 27–29 September 2010 in Tokyo.
This is the first edition under the name "LinuxCon Japan" but it is the renamed second edition of "Japan Linux Symposium".
LinuxCon Japan 2011
Held on 1–3 June 2011 in Yokohama.
LinuxCon North America 2011
Held on 17–19 August 2011 in Vancouver, British Columbia.
LinuxCon Europe 2011
Held on 26–28 October 2011 in Prague.
This is the first edition of LinuxCon Europe.
LinuxCon Brazil 2011
Held on 17–18 November 2011 in São Paulo.
LinuxCon Japan 2012
Held on 6–8 June 2012 in Yokohama.
LinuxCon North America 2012
Held on 29–31 August 2012 in San Diego.
This was also the first edition of CloudOpen.
LinuxCon Europe 2012
Held on 5–7 November 2012 in Barcelona.
LinuxCon Japan 2013
Held on 29–31 May 2013 in Tokyo.
LinuxCon North America 2013
Held on 16–18 September 2013 in New Orleans.
LinuxCon Europe 2013
Held on 21–23 October 2013 in Edinburgh.
LinuxCon North America 2014
Held on 20–22 August 2014 in Chicago.
LinuxCon Europe 2014
Held on 13–15 October 2014 in Düsseldorf.
LinuxCon North America 2015
Held on 17–19 August 2015 in Seattle
LinuxCon Europe 2015
Held on 5–7 October 2015 in Dublin.
LinuxCon North America 2016
Held on 22–24 August 2016 in Toronto, Ontario.
LinuxCon Europe 2016
Held on 4–6 October 2016 in Berlin.
Open Source Summit North America 2017
Held on 11–14 September 2017 in Los Angeles
Open Source Summit Europe 2017
Held 23–26 October 2017 in Prague
Open Source Summit Japan 2018
Held 20–22 June 2018 in Tokyo
Open Source Summit North America 2018
Held 29–31 August 2018 in Vancouver, British Columbia.
Open Source Summit Europe 2018
Held 22–24 October 2018 in Edinburgh
Open Source Summit Europe 2019
Held 28–30 October 2019 in Lyon
Open Source Summit Europe 2022
Held 13–16 September 2022 in Dublin
Open Source Summit North America 2023
Held on May 10–12, 2023 in Vancouver.
Open Source Summit North America 2024
Held on April 16–18, 2024 in Seattle.
Open Source Summit North America 2025
Held on June 23-25, 2025 in Denver.
