= Fluid Framework =

Computer platform for real-time collaboration across applications

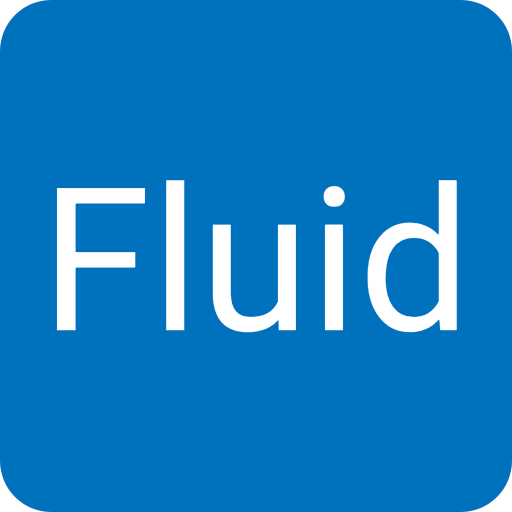
- Developer(s): Microsoft
- Initial release: September 2020; 4 years ago
- Stable release: Client: v0.27.1 Server: v0.1013.0 / Client: October 16, 2020; 4 years ago Server: September 23, 2020; 4 years ago
- Repository: github.com/microsoft/FluidFramework
- Written in: TypeScript, JavaScript
- Platform: Cross-platform
- Available in: English
- Type: Software library for building distributed, real-time collaborative web applications
- License: MIT License
- Website: fluidframework.com

Fluid is a free and open source computer platform for real-time collaboration across applications. Microsoft first demonstrated the software at its Build conference in May 2019 as a framework that would allow for real-time collaboration between users of its Office on the web online office suite. It replaces the concept of a "document" with a cloud address for real-time collaboration and sharing of content forms including text and tables. Microsoft expects to implement it in its Teams chat software, Outlook mail software, and other productivity software. It is designed for integration with other services, such as live translation and Cortana voice assistance. Public and private previews of the software began in November 2019. Microsoft open sourced the software in September 2020.

== See also ==
- Distributed computing
- Document collaboration
