= R Tools for Visual Studio =

Plugin for Microsoft Visual Studio

R Tools for Visual Studio (RTVS)
- Developer: Microsoft
- Initial release: March 5, 2016; 9 years ago
- Stable release: 1.0 RC3 / March 10, 2017; 8 years ago
- Repository: github.com/microsoft/rtvs
- Written in: C#, C++, R
- Operating system: Microsoft Windows
- Available in: English
- Type: Integrated development environment
- License: Apache License 2.0
- Website: visualstudio.microsoft.com/vs/features/rtvs/

R Tools for Visual Studio (RTVS) is a plug-in for the Microsoft Visual Studio integrated development environment (IDE), used to provide support for programming in the language R. It supports IntelliSense, debugging, plotting, remote execution, SQL integration, and more. It is distributed as free and open-source software under the Apache License 2.0, and is developed mainly by Microsoft.

The first version released was 0.3 on March 5, 2016, and the current (version 1.0) was released in 2017. However, the project is described as "not actively supported" since February 2019.

== See also ==
- R interfaces
- Python Tools for Visual Studio
