= ASP.NET AJAX =

Set of ASP.NET extensions

- Original author: Microsoft
- Initial release: January 23, 2007; 18 years ago
- Operating system: Microsoft Windows, Linux, macOS
- Type: Software framework
- License: Microsoft Public License
- Website: ajax.asp.net

ASP.NET AJAX, formerly called Atlas, is a set of extensions to ASP.NET developed by Microsoft for implementing Ajax functionality. It is released under the Microsoft Public License (Ms-PL).

== Clients supporting Ajax ==
ASP.NET AJAX runs on the following browsers:

- Microsoft Internet Explorer (>= 6.0)
- Mozilla Firefox (>= 1.5)
- Opera (>= 9.0)
- Apple Safari (>= 2.0)
- Google Chrome (>= 5)

== ASP.NET AJAX Suite ==
At present, the ASP.NET AJAX suite consists of the following components and packages:

- Microsoft Now Launched Ajax Library 4.0, which supports Data Driven Web Applications.
- Microsoft Ajax Library 3.5, which is a JavaScript library that provides the client-side features of the ASP.NET AJAX framework. Integrated in ASP.NET 3.5, the library is also available as a separate download for use in other environments, such as PHP.
- A server framework – included in ASP.NET 3.5 – for building Ajax-enabled ASP.NET server controls. These components are also available for ASP.NET 2.0 in a separate package called ASP.NET AJAX 1.0 Extensions.
- ASP.NET 2.0 AJAX Templates, a package with a set of Visual Studio templates for building ASP.NET AJAX applications with ASP.NET 2.0 and Visual Studio 2008.
- ASP.NET AJAX Preview, a package with the new features that will be part of the future versions of the framework.

== Microsoft Ajax Library ==
The Microsoft Ajax Library is a JavaScript library that provides the features for the client portion of the ASP.NET AJAX framework.

- Components – The library provides an infrastructure to build either visual or non-visual JavaScript components. A global JavaScript object – Sys.Application – is responsible for managing the lifecycle of client components.
- JavaScript extensions – An enhanced type system is introduced to emulate object-oriented constructs such as namespaces, classes and interfaces; and to perform reflection on client types.
- Abstraction API – Common operations on the DOM (retrieving elements, setting styles and other manipulations) are automatically translated by the library into browser-specific calls.
- Ajax – A set of client components is provided to handle Ajax requests and web-service calls.
- Application Services – The library allows accessing the ASP.NET Membership, Authentication, Roles and Profile services from the client side.

Recently, new features have been announced as part of the ASP.NET AJAX 4.0 release:

- Template Engine – Allows displaying data on the client side by using HTML templates and a custom binding notation. This approach avoids performing page rendering on the server side.
- Declarative instantiation of client components – Allows registration, instantiation and configuration of client components using markup code, without writing any imperative JavaScript code.
- Live Bindings – Synchronize "element properties".

== The UpdatePanel Control ==
The UpdatePanel is an ASP.NET server control that updates portions of a web page without reloading it. Through a mechanism called asynchronous postback, the HTML for the region of the page wrapped by the control is sent by the server asynchronously through an Ajax request. The ASP.NET controls that have been specified as content in an UpdatePanel are able to cause either synchronous (traditional) or asynchronous postbacks, by means of triggers.

A trigger is an event coming from an ASP.NET control that causes an UpdatePanel to refresh its contents. Through triggers, an asynchronous postback can be started also by controls that are declared outside the region of the ASP.NET page wrapped by the UpdatePanel control.

In the following code, only the content of the Update control (the span element that displays the current date and time) is re-rendered every time the button is clicked.

<asp:Button ID="Button1" runat="server" Text="Refresh" />

<asp:UpdatePanel ID="UpdatePanel1" runat="server">
  <Triggers>
    <asp:AsyncPostBackTrigger ControlID="Button1" EventName="Click" />
  </Triggers>
  <ContentTemplate>
    <span><%= DateTime.Now %></span>
  </ContentTemplate>
</asp:UpdatePanel>

== Web-services and JSON ==
ASP.NET AJAX framework brings JSONserialization features to the ASP.NET web-services and allows calling web-services from client-side JavaScript, even using third-party JavaScript-libraries like jQuery.

== See also ==
- Ajax framework
