= Outercurve Foundation =

Defunct non-profit software foundation

- Formation: September 10, 2009; 17 years ago
- Dissolved: April 22, 2017; 9 years ago
- Type: NGO and Non-profit organization
- Legal status: Foundation
- Region served: Worldwide
- Executive Director: Erynn Petersen

The Outercurve Foundation was an independent 501(c)(6) non-profit corporation founded by Microsoft. Its goal was to "enable the exchange of code and understanding among software companies and open source communities." They ran several software projects, some of which were connected to the .NET Framework.

It was founded on September 10, 2009, as the CodePlex Foundation, led mostly by Microsoft employees and affiliates. The free software community considered the site subversive and suspected Microsoft's goal was to make people dependent on Windows and other software owned by Microsoft. The name Outercurve Foundation was adopted in September 2010. In November 2010 changes to by-laws were made and the board was expanded. Outercurve now serves the larger free and open-source community as a generalized low-overhead foundation for projects and organizations. Projects contributed by the group to the .NET Foundation include Nuget, Kudu and the ASP.NET AJAX library.

Outercurve directors filed articles of dissolution to the Washington Secretary of State on April 22, 2017.

== See also ==
- Free software movement
