= Shared Source Initiative =

Source-available software licensing scheme by Microsoft

The Shared Source Initiative (SSI) is a source-available software licensing scheme launched by Microsoft in May 2001. The program includes a spectrum of technologies and licenses, and most of its source code offerings are available for download after eligibility criteria are met.

== Overview ==
Microsoft's Shared Source Initiative allows individuals and organizations to access Microsoft's source code for reference (e.g. when developing complementary systems), for review and auditing from a security perspective (mostly wanted by some large corporations and governments), and for development (academic institutions, individual developers, OEMs, ODMs, OBMs, IHVs, IBVs, ISVs). For example, higher-level OEMs, such as Dell, HP and Nokia, can get more source code of Microsoft Windows.

As part of the framework, Microsoft released 5 licenses for general use. Two of them, Microsoft Public License and Microsoft Reciprocal License, have been approved by the Open Source Initiative as open source licenses and are regarded by the Free Software Foundation as free software licenses. Other shared source licenses are proprietary, and thus allow the copyright holder to retain tighter control over the use of their product.

Microsoft's Shared Source Initiative has been imitated by other companies such as RISC OS Open Ltd.

Microsoft also uses specific licenses for some of their products, such as the Shared Source CLI License and the Microsoft Windows Embedded CE 6.0 Shared Source License.

== Free and open-source licenses ==
The following licenses are considered open-source by the Open Source Initiative and free by the Free Software Foundation.

=== Microsoft Public License (Ms-PL) ===
This is the least restrictive of the Microsoft licenses and allows for distribution of compiled code for either commercial or non-commercial purposes under any license that complies with the Ms-PL. Redistribution of the source code itself is permitted only under the Ms-PL. Initially titled Microsoft Permissive License, it was renamed to Microsoft Public License while being reviewed for approval by the Open Source Initiative (OSI). The license was approved on October 12, 2007, along with the Ms-RL. According to the Free Software Foundation, it is a free software license but not compatible with the GNU GPL. Ms-PL provides a free and flexible licensing for developers using source codes under this license. However, the Ms-PL is a copyleft license because it requires the source code of software it governs to be distributed only under the same license (the Ms-PL).

=== Microsoft Reciprocal License (Ms-RL) ===
This Microsoft license allows for distribution of derived code so long as the modified source files are included and retain the Ms-RL. The Ms-RL allows those files in the distribution that do not contain code originally licensed under Ms-RL to be licensed according to the copyright holder's choosing. This is similar, but not the same as the CDDL, EPL or LGPL (GPL with a typical "linking exception"). Initially known as the Microsoft Community License, it was renamed during the OSI approval process.

On December 9, 2005, the Ms-RL license was submitted to the Open Source Initiative for approval by John Cowan. OSI then contacted Microsoft and asked if they wanted OSI to proceed. Microsoft replied that they did not wish to be reactive and that they needed time to review such a decision.

At the O'Reilly Open Source Convention in July 2007, Bill Hilf, director of Microsoft's work with open source projects, announced that Microsoft had formally submitted Ms-PL and Ms-RL to OSI for approval. It was approved on October 12, 2007, along with the Ms-PL. According to the Free Software Foundation, it is a free software license but not compatible with the GNU GPL.

== Restricted licenses ==
The following source-available software licenses have limitations that prevent them from being open-source according to the Open Source Initiative and free to the Free Software Foundation.

=== Microsoft Limited Public License (Ms-LPL) ===
This is a version of the Microsoft Public License in which rights are only granted to developers of Microsoft Windows-based software. This license is not open source, as defined by the OSI, because the restriction limiting use of the software to Windows violates the stipulation that open-source licenses must be technology-neutral. It is also considered to be non-free by the Free Software Foundation due to this restriction.

=== Microsoft Limited Reciprocal License (Ms-LRL) ===
This is a version of the Microsoft Reciprocal License in which rights are only granted when developing software for a Microsoft Windows platform. Like the Ms-LPL, this license is not open source because it is not technology-neutral due to its restriction that licensed software must be used on Windows, and is also not considered free by the Free Software Foundation due to this restriction.

=== Microsoft Reference Source License (Ms-RSL) ===
This is the most restrictive of the Microsoft Shared Source licenses. The source code is made available to view for reference purposes only, mainly to be able to view Microsoft classes source code while debugging. Developers may not distribute or modify the code for commercial or non-commercial purposes. The license has previously been abbreviated Ms-RL, but Ms-RL now refers to the Microsoft Reciprocal License.

== Criticism ==
Two specific shared source licenses are interpreted as free software and open source licenses by FSF and OSI. However, former OSI president Michael Tiemann considers the phrase "Shared Source" itself to be a marketing term created by Microsoft. He argues that it is "an insurgent term that distracts and dilutes the Open Source message by using similar-sounding terms and offering similar-sounding promises".

The Shared Source Initiative has also been noted to increase the problem of license proliferation.

== See also ==
- Open Source Initiative
- Source-available software
- Software using the Microsoft Public License (category)
