= Comparison of Microsoft Windows versions =

Microsoft Windows is the name of several families of computer software operating systems created by Microsoft. Microsoft first introduced an operating environment named Windows in November 1985 as an add-on to MS-DOS in response to the growing interest in graphical user interfaces (GUIs).

All versions of Microsoft Windows are commercial proprietary software.

== General information ==
Basic general information about Windows.

=== DOS shells ===
Name	Release date	Latest version	Support status	Codename	OS required	Architecture	Editions	Target market
Windows 1.0	1985-11-20	1.04 (1987-04-08)	Unsupported (2001-12-31)	Interface Manager	DOS 2.0 or higher	16-bit		Desktops
Windows 2.0	1987-09-08	2.03 (1987-12-09)	Unsupported (2001-12-31)		DOS 3.0 or higher	16-bit	Windows 2.0; Windows/386 2.0	Desktops
Windows 2.1x	1988-05-27	2.11 (1989-03-13)	Unsupported (2001-12-31)		DOS 3.0 or higher	16-bit	Windows/286 2.1x Windows/386 2.1x	Desktops
Windows 3.0	1990-05-22	3.0a with Multimedia Extensions (1991-10-20)	Unsupported (2001-12-31)		DOS 3.1 or higher	16-bit	Windows 3.0; Windows 3.0a Windows 3.0a with Multimedia Extensions	Desktops
Windows 3.1x	1992-04-06	3.11 (1993-12-31)	Unsupported (2001-12-31)	Janus: 3.1 for Workgroups: Kato; 3.11: Snowball (LB); 3.11 for Workgroups: Sparta	DOS 3.3 or higher	16-bit*	Windows 3.1; Windows for Workgroups 3.1; Windows 3.11; Windows for Workgroups 3.11; Windows 3.2 (Simplified Chinese only)	Desktops

* Has partial 32-bit compatibility with Win32s

=== Windows 9x ===
Name	Release date	RTM build	Latest version	Support status	Codename	MS-DOS version	Kernel type	Architecture	Editions	Target market
Windows 95	1995-07-14	950	4.00.950C OSR2.5 (1997-11-26)	Unsupported (2001-12-31)	Chicago	MS-DOS 7.0, MS-DOS 7.1 (OSR2.x)	Monolithic	Hybrid 16/32-bit	Retail, OSR1, OSR2, OSR2.1, OSR2.5	Desktops
Windows 98	1998-05-15	1998	4.10.1998	Unsupported (2006-07-11)	Memphis	MS-DOS 7.1	Monolithic	Hybrid 16/32-bit		Desktops
Windows 98 SE	1999-05-05	2222	4.10.2222A (2000-02-25)	Unsupported (2006-07-11)		MS-DOS 7.1	Monolithic	Hybrid 16/32-bit		Desktops
Windows Me	2000-06-19	3000	4.90.3000 (2000-09-14)	Unsupported (2006-07-11)	Millennium	MS-DOS 8.0	Monolithic	Hybrid 16/32-bit		Desktops

=== Windows NT ===
Name		Release date	Version	RTM build	Latest build	Support status	Codename, working name	Supported architectures	Editions	OS type
Windows NT 3.1		1993-10-24	3.1	511	528 (SP3) (1994-11-10)	Unsupported (2000-12-31)	NT OS/2; Razzle	IA-32, DEC Alpha, MIPS	Workstation, Advanced Server	Workstation, Server
Windows NT 3.5		1994-09-21	3.5	807	807 (SP3) (1995-06-21)	Unsupported (2001-12-31)	Daytona	IA-32, DEC Alpha, MIPS, PowerPC	Workstation, Server	Workstation, Server
Windows NT 3.51		1995-05-30	3.51	1057	1057 (SP5) (1996-09-19)	Unsupported (2001-12-31)	—N/a	IA-32, DEC Alpha, MIPS, PowerPC	Workstation, Server	Workstation, Server
Windows NT 4.0		1996-08-24	4.0	1381	1381 (SP6a) (1999-11-30)	Unsupported (2004-06-30); Extended Security Updates were released until 2006.	Cairo/Shell Update Release; Hydra (Terminal Server); Impala (Embedded)	IA-32, DEC Alpha, MIPS, PowerPC	Workstation, Server, Server Enterprise Edition, Terminal Server, Embedded	Workstation, Server, Embedded PCs
Windows 2000		2000-02-17	5.0	2195	SP4 Rollup 1 v2 (2005-09-13)	Unsupported (2010-07-13)	Windows NT 5.0: Windows 2000 64-bit: Janus	IA-32	Professional, Server, Advanced Server, Datacenter Server, Powered (Embedded)	Desktop, Workstation, Server, Embedded PCs
Windows XP		2001-10-25	5.1	2600	2600 (SP3) (2008-04-21)	Unsupported (2014-04-08)	Whistler	IA-32, IA-64, x86-64	Home^{K}, Professional^{K}^{x64}, Media Center, Tablet PC, Starter, Embedded	Desktop, Workstation, Embedded PCs
Windows Server 2003		2003-04-24	5.2	3790	3790 (SP2) (2007-03-13)	Unsupported (2015-07-14)	Whistler Server, Windows.NET Server	IA-32, IA-64, x86-64	Standard, Enterprise, Datacenter, Web, Storage, Small Business Server, Compute Cluster	Server, Network Appliance, Embedded PCs, HPC
Windows Server 2003 R2		2006-03-05	5.2	3790	?	Unsupported (2015-07-14)	?	IA-32, x86-64		Server, Network Appliance, Embedded PCs, HPC
Windows Fundamentals for Legacy PCs		2006-07-08	5.1	2600	—N/a	Unsupported (2014-04-08)	Eiger, Mönch	IA-32	Fundamentals for Legacy PCs	Desktop
Windows Vista		2007-01-30	6.0	6000	6002 (SP2) (2009-04-28)	Unsupported (2017-04-11)	Longhorn	IA-32, x86-64	Starter, Home Basic^{K}, Home Premium^{K}, Business^{K}, Enterprise^{K}, Ultimate^{K}	Desktop, Workstation
Windows Home Server		2007-11-04	5.2	3790	—N/a	Unsupported (2013-01-08)	Q, Quattro	IA-32, x86-64	Home Server	Server
Windows Server 2008		2008-02-27	6.0	6001	6002 (SP2) (2009-04-28)	Unsupported (2020-01-14); Grandfathered paid Premium Assurance (limited to some critical security issues) security update support ended on January 13, 2026.	Longhorn Server	x86-64, IA-64, IA-32	Web^{Core}, Standard^{Core}^{wHV}^{CwHV}, Enterprise^{Core}^{wHV}^{CwHV}, Small Business Server, Datacenter^{Core}^{wHV}^{CwHV}, HPC, HyperV Core, Foundation, Storage	Server
Windows 7		2009-10-22	6.1	7600	7601 (SP1) (2011-02-22)	Unsupported (2020-01-14)	7	IA-32, x86-64	Starter^{K}, Home Basic^{K}, Home Premium^{K}, Professional^{K}, Ultimate^{K}, Enterprise^{K}	Desktop, Workstation, Multi-touch
Windows Server 2008 R2		2009-10-22	6.1	7600	7601 (SP1) (2011-02-22)	Unsupported (2020-01-14); Grandfathered paid Premium Assurance (limited to some critical security issues) security update support ended on January 13, 2026.	7 Server	x86-64, IA-64	Standard^{Core}, Enterprise^{Core}, Datacenter^{Core}, Web^{Core}	Server
Windows Home Server 2011		2011-04-06	6.1	8400	—N/a	Unsupported (2016-04-12)	Vail	x86-64	Home Server	Server
Windows Server 2012		2012-09-04	6.2	9200	—N/a	Unsupported (2023-10-10)	8 Server	x86-64	Foundation, Essentials, Standard, Datacenter, Storage Standard, Storage Workgroup	Server
Windows 8		2012-10-26	6.2	9200	—N/a	(RTM only) Unsupported (2016-01-12)	8	IA-32, x86-64, ARMv7	Windows 8, Pro, Enterprise^{K}, Windows RT	Desktop, Workstation, Multi-touch
Windows 8.1		2013-10-17	6.3	9600	—N/a	Unsupported (2023-01-10)	Blue	IA-32, x86-64, ARMv7	Windows 8.1, Pro, Enterprise^{K}, Windows RT 8.1	Desktop, Workstation, Multi-touch
Windows Server 2012 R2		2013-10-18	6.3	9600	—N/a	Unsupported (2023-10-10); Paid support via the Extended Security Updates (ESU) program ended on October 13, 2026.	Blue Server	x86-64	Foundation, Essentials, Standard, Datacenter, Storage Essentials, Storage Standard, Storage Workgroup	Server
Windows 10	Original Release	2015-07-29	10.0	10240	—N/a	Unsupported (2017-05-09)	Threshold	IA-32, x86-64, ARMv7	Home, Pro, Education, Enterprise	Desktop, Workstation, Multi-touch
Windows 10	Original Release	2015-07-29	10.0	10240	—N/a	Unsupported (2025-10-14)	Threshold	IA-32, x86-64, ARMv7	Enterprise LTSB	Desktop, Workstation, Multi-touch
Windows 10	November Update	2015-11-12	10.0	10586	—N/a	Unsupported (2017-10-10)	Threshold 2	IA-32, x86-64, ARMv7	Home, Pro, Education, Enterprise	Desktop, Workstation, Multi-touch
Windows 10	Anniversary Update	2016-08-02	10.0	14393	—N/a	Unsupported (2018-04-10)	Redstone	IA-32, x86-64, ARMv7	Home, Pro, Pro Education	Desktop, Workstation, Multi-touch
Windows 10	Anniversary Update	2016-08-02	10.0	14393	—N/a	Unsupported (2019-04-09)	Redstone	IA-32, x86-64, ARMv7	Education, Enterprise	Desktop, Workstation, Multi-touch
Windows 10	Anniversary Update	2016-08-02	10.0	14393	—N/a	Unsupported (2026-10-13)	Redstone	IA-32, x86-64, ARMv7	Enterprise LTSB	Desktop, Workstation, Multi-touch
Windows 10	Creators Update	2017-04-11	10.0	15063	—N/a	Unsupported (2018-10-09)	Redstone 2	IA-32, x86-64, ARMv7	Home, Pro, Pro Education	Desktop, Workstation, Multi-touch
Windows 10	Creators Update	2017-04-11	10.0	15063	—N/a	Unsupported (2019-10-08)	Redstone 2	IA-32, x86-64, ARMv7	Education, Enterprise	Desktop, Workstation, Multi-touch
Windows 10	Fall Creators Update	2017-10-17	10.0	16299	—N/a	Unsupported (2019-04-09)	Redstone 3	IA-32, x86-64, ARMv7, ARM64	Home, Pro, Pro for Workstations, Pro Education	Desktop, Workstation, Multi-touch
Windows 10	Fall Creators Update	2017-10-17	10.0	16299	—N/a	Unsupported (2020-10-13)	Redstone 3	IA-32, x86-64, ARMv7, ARM64	Education, Enterprise	Desktop, Workstation, Multi-touch
Windows 10	April 2018 Update	2018-04-30	10.0	17134	—N/a	Unsupported (2019-11-12)	Redstone 4	IA-32, x86-64, ARMv7, ARM64	Home, Pro, Pro for Workstations, Pro Education	Desktop, Workstation, Multi-touch
Windows 10	April 2018 Update	2018-04-30	10.0	17134	—N/a	Unsupported (2021-05-11)	Redstone 4	IA-32, x86-64, ARMv7, ARM64	Education, Enterprise	Desktop, Workstation, Multi-touch
Windows 10	October 2018 Update	2018-10-02	10.0	17763	—N/a	Unsupported (2020-11-10)	Redstone 5	IA-32, x86-64, ARMv7, ARM64	Home, Pro, Pro for Workstations, Pro Education	Desktop, Workstation, Multi-touch
Windows 10	October 2018 Update	2018-10-02	10.0	17763	—N/a	Unsupported (2021-05-11)	Redstone 5	IA-32, x86-64, ARMv7, ARM64	Education, Enterprise	Desktop, Workstation, Multi-touch
Windows 10	October 2018 Update	2018-10-02	10.0	17763	—N/a	On extended support (2029-01-09)	Redstone 5	IA-32, x86-64, ARMv7, ARM64	Enterprise LTSC	Desktop, Workstation, Multi-touch
Windows 10	May 2019 Update	2019-05-21	10.0	18362	—N/a	Unsupported (2020-12-08)	19H1	IA-32, x86-64, ARMv7, ARM64	Home, Pro, Pro for Workstations, Pro Education, Education, Enterprise	Desktop, Workstation, Multi-touch
Windows 10	November 2019 Update	2019-11-12	10.0	18363	—N/a	Unsupported (2021-05-11)	19H2	IA-32, x86-64, ARMv7, ARM64	Home, Pro, Pro for Workstations, Pro Education	Desktop, Workstation, Multi-touch
Windows 10	November 2019 Update	2019-11-12	10.0	18363	—N/a	Unsupported (2022-05-10)	19H2	IA-32, x86-64, ARMv7, ARM64	Education, Enterprise	Desktop, Workstation, Multi-touch
Windows 10	May 2020 Update	2020-05-27	10.0	19041	—N/a	Unsupported (2021-12-14)	20H1	IA-32, x86-64, ARMv7, ARM64	Home, Pro, Pro for Workstations, Pro Education, Education, Enterprise	Desktop, Workstation, Multi-touch
Windows 10	October 2020 Update	2020-10-20	10.0	19042	—N/a	Unsupported (2022-05-10)	20H2	IA-32, x86-64, ARMv7, ARM64	Home, Pro, Pro for Workstations, Pro Education	Desktop, Workstation, Multi-touch
Windows 10	October 2020 Update	2020-10-20	10.0	19042	—N/a	Unsupported (2023-05-09)	20H2	IA-32, x86-64, ARMv7, ARM64	Education, Enterprise	Desktop, Workstation, Multi-touch
Windows 10	May 2021 Update	2021-05-18	10.0	19043	—N/a	Unsupported (2022-12-13)	21H1	IA-32, x86-64, ARMv7, ARM64	Home, Pro, Pro for Workstations, Pro Education, Education, Enterprise	Desktop, Workstation, Multi-touch
Windows 10	November 2021 Update	2021-10-16	10.0	19044	—N/a	Unsupported (2023-06-13)	21H2	IA-32, x86-64, ARMv7, ARM64	Home, Pro, Pro for Workstations, Pro Education	Desktop, Workstation, Multi-touch
Windows 10	November 2021 Update	2021-10-16	10.0	19044	—N/a	Unsupported (2024-06-11)	21H2	IA-32, x86-64, ARMv7, ARM64	Education, Enterprise	Desktop, Workstation, Multi-touch
Windows 10	November 2021 Update	2021-10-16	10.0	19044	—N/a	Mainstream support (2027-01-12)	21H2	IA-32, x86-64, ARMv7, ARM64	Enterprise LTSC	Desktop, Workstation, Multi-touch
Windows 10	2022 Update	2022-10-18	10.0	19045	—N/a	Unsupported (2025-10-14); paid Extended Security Updates (ESU) program, which offers continued security updates ended on October 13, 2026 for consumers, or at most October 10, 2028 for businesses and schools.	22H2	IA-32, x86-64, ARMv7, ARM64	Home, Pro, Pro for Workstations, Pro Education; Education, Enterprise	Desktop, Workstation, Multi-touch
Windows Server 2016		2016-10-12	10.0	14393	—N/a	Unsupported (2027-01-12)	Redstone Server	x86-64	Essentials, Standard, Datacenter, MultiPoint Premium, Storage Standard, Storage Workgroup	Server
Windows Server 2019		2018-10-03	10.0	17763	—N/a	On extended support (2029-01-09)	Redstone 5 Server	x86-64	Essentials, Standard, Datacenter	Server
Windows Server 2022		2021-08-18	10.0	20348	—N/a	Extended support (2031-10-14)	21H2 Server	x86-64	Essentials, Standard, Datacenter, Datacenter for Azure	Server
Windows 11	Original Release	2021-10-05	10.0	22000	—N/a	Unsupported (2023-10-10)	Sun Valley (21H2)	x86-64, ARM64	Home, Pro, Pro for Workstations, Pro Education, SE	Desktop, Workstation, Multi-touch
Windows 11	Original Release	2021-10-05	10.0	22000	—N/a	Unsupported (2024-10-08)	Sun Valley (21H2)	x86-64, ARM64	Education, Enterprise	Desktop, Workstation, Multi-touch
Windows 11	2022 Update	2022-09-20	10.0	22621	—N/a	Unsupported (2024-10-08)	22H2	x86-64, ARM64	Home, Pro, Pro for Workstations, Pro Education, SE	Desktop, Workstation, Multi-touch
Windows 11	2022 Update	2022-09-20	10.0	22621	—N/a	Unsupported (2025-10-14)	22H2	x86-64, ARM64	Education, Enterprise	Desktop, Workstation, Multi-touch
Windows 11	2023 Update	2023-10-31	10.0	22631	—N/a	Unsupported (2025-11-11)	23H2	x86-64, ARM64	Home, Pro, Pro for Workstations, Pro Education, SE	Desktop, Workstation, Multi-touch
Windows 11	2023 Update	2023-10-31	10.0	22631	—N/a	Unsupported (2026-11-10)	23H2	x86-64, ARM64	Education, Enterprise	Desktop, Workstation, Multi-touch
Windows 11	2024 Update	2024-10-01	10.0	26100	—N/a	Unsupported (2026-10-13)	24H2	x86-64, ARM64	Home, Pro, Pro for Workstations, Pro Education, SE	Desktop, Workstation, Multi-touch
Windows 11	2024 Update	2024-10-01	10.0	26100	—N/a	Supported (2027-10-12)	24H2	x86-64, ARM64	Education, Enterprise	Desktop, Workstation, Multi-touch
Windows 11	2025 Update	2025-09-30	10.0	26200	—N/a	Supported (2027-10-12)	25H2	x86-64, ARM64	Home, Pro, Pro for Workstations, Pro Education	Desktop, Workstation, Multi-touch
Windows 11	2025 Update	2025-09-30	10.0	26200	—N/a	Supported (2028-10-10)	25H2	x86-64, ARM64	Education, Enterprise	Desktop, Workstation, Multi-touch
Windows 11	26H1	2026-02-10	10.0	28000	—N/a	Supported (2028-03-14)	26H1	ARM64	Home, Pro, Pro for Workstations, Pro Education	Desktop, Workstation, Multi-touch
Windows 11	26H1	2026-02-10	10.0	28000	—N/a	Supported (2029-03-13)	26H1	ARM64	Education, Enterprise	Desktop, Workstation, Multi-touch
Windows 11	26H2	2026-09-29	10.0	26300	—N/a	Supported (2028-10-10)	26H2	x86-64, ARM64	Home, Pro, Pro for Workstations, Pro Education	Desktop, Workstation, Multi-touch
Windows 11	26H2	2026-09-29	10.0	26300	—N/a	Supported (2029-10-09)	26H2	x86-64, ARM64	Education, Enterprise	Desktop, Workstation, Multi-touch
Windows Server 2025		2024-11-01	10.0	26100	—N/a	Mainstream support (2029-10-09); Extended support (2034-10-10)	24H2	x86-64, ARM64	Essentials, Standard, Datacenter, Datacenter for Azure	Server
Name		Release date	Version	RTM build	Latest build	Support status	Codename, working name	Supported architectures	Editions	OS type

^N has also an N-edition
^K has also an N-edition
^KN has also an N-edition
^x64 has a separate x64-edition
^Core has also a Core-edition
^wHV has also an edition without Hyper-V
^CwHV has also a Core-edition without Hyper-V

=== Windows Embedded Compact ===
Windows Embedded Compact (Windows CE) is a discontinued variation of Microsoft's Windows operating system for minimalistic computers and embedded systems. Windows CE was a distinctly different kernel, rather than a trimmed-down version of desktop Windows. It is supported on Intel x86 and is compatible on MIPS, ARM, and Hitachi SuperH processors.

Name	Release date	RTM build	Current version	Support status	Codename	Based on (kernel)	Kernel type	Operating environments	Editions	Purpose	Short description
Windows CE 1.0	1996-11-16			Unsupported	Pegasus, Alder	CE 1.0				Embedded	First release of Microsoft's Windows CE line for minimalistic computers and embedded systems
Windows CE 2.0	1997-11-29			Unsupported	Mercury, Apollo	CE 2.0			2.1, 2.11	Embedded	
Windows CE 3.0	2000-06-15			Unsupported (2007-10-09)	Cedar, Galileo, Rapier, Merlin, Stinger	CE 3.0	Embedded kernel			Embedded	
Windows CE 4.0	2002-01-07			Unsupported	Talisker	CE 4.0			4.1, 4.2	Embedded	
Windows CE 5.0	2004-07-09		5.0 (2004-07-09)	Unsupported (2014-10-14)	Macallan	CE 5.0	Embedded kernel			Embedded	
Windows Embedded CE 6.0	2006-11-01			Unsupported (2018-04-10)	Yamazaki	CE 6.0	Hybrid kernel				
Windows Embedded Compact 7	2011-03-01	?	?	Unsupported (2021-04-13)	Chelan	CE 7.0	Hybrid	? Standard, POSReady			
Windows Embedded Compact 2013	2013-08-11		Update 17 (2017-11-15)	Unsupported (2023-10-10)	—N/a	CE 8.0			Standard; Industry (8.0, 8.1); Handheld	Embedded	

=== Windows IoT ===
The Windows IoT family is the successor to the Windows Embedded family.

Name		Release date	Version	RTM build	Editions	License	OS type	Support status
Windows 10 IoT	Anniversary Update	2016-08-02	NT 10.0	14393	Core	OEM	IoT	Unsupported (2018-04-10)
Windows 10 IoT	Anniversary Update	2016-08-02	NT 10.0	14393	Enterprise	OEM	IoT	Unsupported (2019-04-09)
Windows 10 IoT	Anniversary Update	2016-08-02	NT 10.0	14393	Enterprise LTSB	OEM	IoT	Unsupported (2026-10-13)
Windows 10 IoT	Creators Update	2017-04-11	NT 10.0	15063	Core	OEM	IoT	Unsupported (2018-10-09)
Windows 10 IoT	Creators Update	2017-04-11	NT 10.0	15063	Enterprise	OEM	IoT	Unsupported (2019-10-08)
Windows 10 IoT	Fall Creators Update	2017-10-17	NT 10.0	16299	Core	OEM	IoT	Unsupported (2019-04-09)
Windows 10 IoT	Fall Creators Update	2017-10-17	NT 10.0	16299	Enterprise	OEM	IoT	Unsupported (2020-10-13)
Windows 10 IoT	April 2018 Update	2018-04-30	NT 10.0	17134	Core	OEM	IoT	Unsupported (2019-11-12)
Windows 10 IoT	April 2018 Update	2018-04-30	NT 10.0	17134	Enterprise	OEM	IoT	Unsupported (2021-05-11)
Windows 10 IoT	October 2018 Update	2018-10-02	NT 10.0	17763	Core	OEM	IoT	Unsupported (2020-11-10)
Windows 10 IoT	October 2018 Update	2018-10-02	NT 10.0	17763	Enterprise	OEM	IoT	Unsupported (2021-05-11)
Windows 10 IoT	October 2018 Update	2018-10-02	NT 10.0	17763	Core LTSC, Enterprise LTSC	OEM	IoT	On extended support (2029-01-09)
Windows 10 IoT	May 2019 Update	2019-08-29	NT 10.0	18362	Enterprise	OEM	IoT	Unsupported (2020-12-08)
Windows 10 IoT	November 2019 Update	2019-11-12	NT 10.0	18363	Enterprise	OEM	IoT	Unsupported (2022-05-10)
Windows 10 IoT	May 2020 Update	2020-05-27	NT 10.0	19041	Enterprise	OEM	IoT	Unsupported (2021-12-14)
Windows 10 IoT	October 2020 Update	2020-10-20	NT 10.0	19042	Enterprise	OEM	IoT	Unsupported (2023-05-09)
Windows 10 IoT	May 2021 Update	2021-05-18	NT 10.0	19043	Enterprise	OEM	IoT	Unsupported (2022-12-13)
Windows 10 IoT	November 2021 Update	2021-11-16	NT 10.0	19044	Enterprise	OEM	IoT	Unsupported (2024-06-11)
Windows 10 IoT	November 2021 Update	2021-11-16	NT 10.0	19044	Enterprise LTSC	OEM	IoT	On extended support (2032-01-13)
Windows 10 IoT	2022 Update	2022-10-18	NT 10.0	19045	Enterprise	OEM	IoT	Unsupported (2025-10-14)
Windows Server IoT 2019		2019-02-26	NT 10.0	17763	Essentials, Standard, Datacenter, Storage Standard, Storage Workgroup, Telecommunications	OEM	IoT, Server	On extented support (2029-01-09)
Windows Server IoT 2022		2021-08-18	NT 10.0	20348	Standard, Datacenter, Storage Standard, Storage Workgroup, Telecommunications	OEM	IoT, Server	Supported (2031-10-14)
Windows 11 IoT	Original Release	2021-10-04	NT 10.0	22000	Enterprise	OEM	IoT	Unsupported (2024-10-08)
Windows 11 IoT	2022 Update	2022-09-20	NT 10.0	22621	Enterprise	OEM	IoT	Unsupported (2025-10-14)
Windows 11 IoT	2023 Update	2023-10-31	NT 10.0	22631	Enterprise	OEM	IoT	Unsupported (2026-11-10)
Windows 11 IoT	2024 Update	2024-10-01	NT 10.0	26100	Enterprise	OEM	IoT	Supported (2027-10-12)
Windows 11 IoT	2025 Update	2025-09-30	NT 10.0	26200	Enterprise	OEM	IoT	Supported (2028-10-10)
Windows 11 IoT	2026 Update	2026-09-29	NT 10.0	26300	Enterprise	OEM	IoT	Supported (2029-10-09)
Windows Server IoT 2025		2024-11-01	NT 10.0	26100	Standard, Datacenter	OEM	IoT, Server	Supported (2034-10-10)
Name		Release date	Version	RTM build	Editions	License	OS type	Support status

=== Windows Mobile ===
Windows Mobile is Microsoft's discontinued line of operating systems for smartphones.

Name	Release date	RTM build	Current version	Support status	Codename	Based on (kernel)	Supported architectures
Windows Pocket PC 2000	2000-04-19			Unsupported (2007-10-09)	Rapier	CE 3.0	
Windows Pocket PC 2002	2001-10-04			Unsupported (2008-10-14)	Merlin	CE 3.0	
Windows Mobile 2003	2003-06-23			Unsupported (2014-07-08)	Ozone	CE 4.20	
Windows Mobile 5.0	2005-05-9/12			Unsupported (2015-10-13)	Magneto	CE 5.0	
Windows Mobile 6.0	2007-02-12			Unsupported (2013-01-08)	Crossbow	CE 5.2	
Windows Mobile 6.1	2008-04-01			Unsupported (2013-01-08)			
Windows Mobile 6.5	2009-05-11			Unsupported (2013-01-08)			

=== Windows Phone ===
Windows Phone is Microsoft's discontinued line of operating systems for smartphones.

Name	Release date	RTM build	Current version	Support status	Codename	Based on (kernel)	Supported architectures
Windows Phone 7	2010-11-08	7004	7.10.8862	Unsupported	Photon	CE 6.0	ARM
Windows Phone 7.5	2011-09-27	7720	7.10.8862	Unsupported	Mango	CE 6.1	ARM
Windows Phone 7.8	2013-02-01	8858	7.10.8862	Unsupported (2014-10-14)	Tango	CE 6.1	ARM
Windows Phone 8	2012-10-29	10211	10.0.10586	Unsupported (2014-07-08)	Apollo, Portico	NT 6.2	ARM
Windows Phone 8.1	2014-04-14	12359	10.0.10586	Unsupported (2017-07-11)	Blue	NT 6.3	ARM
Windows 10 Mobile	2015-11-08	10586–16299	10.0.10586	Unsupported	Threshold, Redstone	NT 10.0	ARM

== Technical information ==
=== DOS shells ===
Name	Architecture	Integrated firewall	SMP support	USB support	UDMA support	LFN support	Update management	APIs	Safe Mode
Windows 1.0	x86 16-bit	No	No	No	No	No	No	Win16	No
Windows 2.0	x86 16-bit	No	No	No	No	No	No	Win16	No
Windows 2.1x	x86 16-bit	No	No	No	No	No	No	Win16	No
Windows 3.0	x86 16-bit	No	No	No	No	No	No	Win16	No
Windows 3.1x	x86 16-bit (partial 32-bit compatibility through Win32s)	No	No	No	No	No	No	Win16, Win32s	No

=== Windows 9x ===
Name	Kernel	Kernel type	Architecture	Integrated firewall	SMP support	USB support	UDMA support	LFN support	Update management	APIs	DDIs	Safe Mode	DirectX
Windows 95	MS-DOS 7.0 (Win95, Win95A), MS-DOS 7.1 (Win95B, Win95C)	Monolithic kernel	x86, hybrid 16/32-bit	No	No	Partial (OSR 2.1/2.5 only)	Partial (OSR 2.x only)	Yes	Windows Update (requires Internet Explorer 4 or higher)	Win16, Win32	DOS, DLL, VxD, WDM (USB-only), direct-access	Yes	N/A (RTM/OSR1); 2.0a (OSR2/2.1); 5.0 (OSR2.5); 8.0a (optional)
Windows 98	MS-DOS 7.1	Monolithic kernel	x86, hybrid 16/32-bit	No	No	Yes	Yes	Yes	Windows Update	Win16, Win32	DOS, DLL, VxD, WDM (partial), direct-access	Yes	5.2; 9.0c (Oct 2006) (optional)
Windows 98 Second Edition	MS-DOS 7.1	Monolithic kernel	x86, hybrid 16/32-bit	No	No	Yes	Yes	Yes	Windows Update	Win16, Win32	DOS, DLL, VxD, WDM (partial), direct-access	Yes	6.1a 9.0c (Oct 2006) (optional)
Windows Me	MS-DOS 8.0	Monolithic kernel	x86, hybrid 16/32-bit	No	No	Yes	Yes	Yes	Windows Update	Win16, Win32	DLL, VxD, WDM (partial), direct-access	Yes	7.1; 9.0c (Oct 2006) (optional)

It is possible to install the MS-DOS variants 7.0 and 7.1 without the graphics user interface of Windows. If an independent installation of both, DOS and Windows is desired, DOS ought to be installed prior to Windows, at the start of a small partition. The system must be transferred by the (dangerous) "SYSTEM" DOS-command, while the other files constituting DOS can simply be copied (the files located in the DOS-root and the entire COMMAND directory). Such a stand-alone installation of MS-DOS 8 is not possible, as it is designed to work as real mode for Windows Me and nothing else.

=== Windows NT ===
The Windows NT kernel powers all recent Windows operating systems. It has run on IA-32, x64, DEC Alpha, MIPS architecture, PowerPC, Itanium, ARMv7, and ARM64 processors, but currently supported versions run on IA-32, x64, ARMv7, and ARM64.

Name	Architecture	Store	Integrated firewall	SMP support	USB support	UDMA support	Long filename support	Package management	Update management	APIs	DDIs	Safe Mode	Data Execution Prevention	DirectX
Windows NT 3.1	IA-32, DEC Alpha, MIPS	—N/a	No	Yes	No	PIO only	Yes (NTFS and HPFS volumes only)	—N/a		Win32, OS/2, POSIX	DLL, KMD	No	No	No
Windows NT 3.5	IA-32, DEC Alpha, MIPS	—N/a	No	Yes	No	PIO only	Yes (except on CDFS volumes)	—N/a		Win32, OS/2, POSIX	DLL, KMD	No	No	No
Windows NT 3.51	IA-32, DEC Alpha, MIPS, PowerPC	—N/a	No	Yes	No	PIO only	Yes (except on CDFS volumes)	—N/a		Win32, OS/2, POSIX	DLL, KMD	No	No	No
Windows NT 4.0	IA-32, DEC Alpha, MIPS, PowerPC	—N/a	No	Yes	Partial (with third-party device drivers)	Yes with SP4	Yes	—N/a	Windows Update (if Internet Explorer 4 or later is installed)	Win32, OS/2, POSIX	DLL, KMD	No	No	Yes; 3.0a, 5.0 (unofficial)
Windows 2000	IA-32	—N/a	No	Yes	Yes (USB 2.0 with update or SP4)	Yes	Yes	—N/a	Windows Update, WSUS	Win32, OS/2, POSIX	DLL, KMD, WDM, KMDF	Yes	No	Yes; 7.0, 9.0c (Feb 2010) (optional)
Windows XP	IA-32 (NT5.1), Itanium (NT5.1/5.2), x64 (NT5.2)	—N/a	Yes	Yes (Professional Edition only)	Yes (USB 2.0 with update or SP1+)	Yes	Yes	—N/a	Windows Update, WSUS	Win32, .NET	DLL, KMD, WDM, KMDF, UMDFv1	Yes	Yes (in SP2)	Yes; 9.0c
Windows Server 2003	IA-32, Itanium, x64	—N/a	Yes	Yes	Yes (USB 2.0)	Yes	Yes	—N/a	Windows Update, WSUS	Win32	DLL, KMD, WDM, KMDF, UMDFv1	Yes	Yes (with SP1)	Yes; 9.0c
Windows Fundamentals for Legacy PCs	IA-32	—N/a	Yes	No	Yes	Yes	Yes	—N/a	Windows Update, WSUS	Win32	DLL, KMD, WDM, KMDF, UMDFv1	Yes	Yes	Yes; 9.0c
Windows Vista	IA-32, x64	Windows Marketplace	Yes	Yes	Yes (USB 2.0)	Yes	Yes	—N/a	Windows Update, WSUS	Win32, .NET, POSIX (only Enterprise and Ultimate)	DLL, KMD, WDM, KMDF, UMDFv1	Yes	Yes	Yes; 10.1; 11.0 (optional)
Windows Server 2008	IA-32, Itanium, x64	—N/a	Yes	Yes	Yes (USB 2.0)	Yes	Yes	—N/a	Windows Update, WSUS	Win32	DLL, KMD, WDM, KMDF, UMDFv1	Yes	Yes	Yes; 10.1; 11.0 (optional)
Windows Home Server	IA-32	—N/a	Yes	Yes	Yes (USB 2.0)	Yes	Yes	—N/a	Windows Update	Win32	DLL, KMD, WDM, KMDF, UMDFv1	Yes	Yes	Yes; 9.0c
Windows 7	IA-32, x64	—N/a	Yes	Yes	Yes (USB 3.0)	Yes	Yes	—N/a	Windows Update, WSUS	Win32, .NET	DLL, KMD, WDM, KMDF, UMDFv1	Yes	Yes	Yes; 11.0; 11.1 (optional)
Windows Server 2008 R2	Itanium, x64	—N/a	Yes	Yes	Yes (USB 3.0)	Yes	Yes	—N/a	Windows Update, WSUS	Win32, .NET	DLL, KMD, WDM, KMDF, UMDFv1	Yes	Yes	Yes; 11.0; 11.1 (optional)
Windows Home Server 2011	x64	—N/a	Yes	Yes	Yes (USB 3.0)	Yes	Yes	—N/a	Windows Update	Win32	DLL, KMD, WDM, KMDF, UMDFv1	Yes	Yes	Yes; 11.0; 11.1 (optional)
Windows Server 2012	x64	Windows Store	Yes	Yes	Yes (USB 3.0)	Yes	Yes	Windows Store	Windows Update, WSUS	Win32, .NET, WinRT	DLL, KMD, WDM, KMDF, UMDFv1	Yes	Yes	Yes; 11.1
Windows 8	IA-32, x64	Windows Store	Yes	Yes	Yes (USB 3.0)	Yes	Yes	Windows Store	Windows Update, WSUS	Win32, .NET, WinRT	DLL, KMD, WDM, KMDF, UMDFv1	Yes	Yes	Yes; 11.1
Windows 8.1	IA-32, x64	Windows Store	Yes	Yes	Yes (USB 3.0)	Yes	Yes	Windows Store, PowerShell	Windows Update, WSUS, Windows Store	Win32, .NET, WinRT	DLL, KMD, WDM, KMDF, UMDFv1, UMDFv2	Yes	Yes	Yes; 11.2
Windows Server 2012 R2	x64	Windows Store	Yes	Yes	Yes (USB 3.0)	Yes	Yes	Windows Store	Windows Update, WSUS, Windows Store	Win32, .NET, WinRT	DLL, KMD, WDM, KMDF, UMDFv1, UMDFv2	Yes	Yes	Yes; 11.2
Windows 10	IA-32, x64	Windows Store	Yes	Yes	Yes (USB 3.1 and Thunderbolt 3)	Yes	Yes	Windows Store, PowerShell	Windows Update, WSUS, Windows Store	Win32, .NET, WinRT, Linux	DLL, KMD, WDM, KMDF, UMDFv1, UMDFv2	Yes	Yes	Yes; 12
Windows Server 2016	x64	Windows Store	Yes	Yes	Yes (USB 3.1 and Thunderbolt 3)	Yes	Yes	Windows Store	Windows Update, WSUS, Windows Store	Win32, .NET, WinRT	DLL, KMD, WDM, KMDF, UMDFv1, UMDFv2	Yes	Yes	Yes; 12

=== Windows Phone ===
Name	Architecture	Integrated firewall	SMP support	USB support	UDMA support	Package management	APIs
Windows Phone 8	ARMv7	Yes	Yes	Yes (USB 2.0)	Yes	Windows Phone Store	Silverlight
Windows Phone 8.1	ARMv7	Yes	Yes	Yes	Yes	Windows Phone Store	Silverlight; WinRT
Windows 10 Mobile	ARMv7	Yes	Yes	Yes	Yes	Microsoft Store	Silverlight; WinRT

== Supported file systems ==
Various versions of Windows support various file systems, including:FAT12, FAT16, FAT32, HPFS, or NTFS, along with network file systems shared from other computers, and the ISO 9660 and UDF file systems used for CDs, DVDs, and other optical disc drives such as Blu-ray. Each file system is usually limited in application to certain media, for example CDs must use ISO 9660 or UDF, and as of Windows Vista, NTFS is the only file system which the operating system can be installed on. Windows Embedded CE 6.0, Windows Vista Service Pack 1, and Windows Server 2008 onwards support exFAT, a file system more suitable for USB flash drives.

=== Windows 9x ===
	FAT12	FAT16	FAT32	HPFS	ISO 9660	NTFS	UDF
Windows 95	Yes	Yes	Yes (OSR2 or above)	Network Drive	Yes	Network Drive	No
Windows 98	Yes	Yes	Yes	Network Drive	Yes	Network Drive	Yes (1.5, read)
Windows Me	Yes	Yes	Yes	Network Drive	Yes	Network Drive	Yes (1.5, read)

=== Windows NT ===
	FAT12	FAT16	FAT32	HPFS	ISO 9660	NTFS	exFAT	UDF	ReFS
Windows NT 3.1	Yes	Yes	No	Yes	Yes	Yes v1.0	No	?	No
, 3.51	Yes	Yes	No	Yes	Yes	Yes v1.1	No	?	No
Windows NT 4.0	Yes	Yes	No	Partial	Yes	Yes v1.2	No	?	No
Windows 2000	Yes	Yes	Yes	No	Yes	Yes v3.0	No	Yes	No
Windows XP	Yes	Yes	Yes	No	Yes	Yes v3.1	Optional	Yes (2.01)	No
Windows Server 2003	Yes	Yes	Yes	No	Yes	Yes v3.1	Optional	Yes	No
Windows Vista	Yes	Yes	Yes	No	Yes	Yes v5	Yes	Yes (2.6)	No
Windows Server 2008	Yes	Yes	Yes	No	Yes	Yes v5	Yes	Yes	No
Windows 7	Yes	Yes	Yes	No	Yes	Yes v5	Yes	Yes (2.6)	Yes
Windows Server 2008 R2	Yes	Yes	Yes	No	Yes	Yes v5	Yes	Yes (2.6)	Yes
Windows Server 2012	Yes	Yes	Yes	No	Yes	Yes v5	Yes	Yes (2.6)	Yes
Windows 8	Yes	Yes	Yes	No	Yes	Yes v5	Yes	Yes (2.6)	No
Windows 8.1	Yes	Yes	Yes	No	Yes	Yes v5	Yes	Yes (2.6)	Yes
Windows Server 2012 R2	Yes	Yes	Yes	No	Yes	Yes v5	Yes	Yes (2.6)	Yes
Windows 10	Yes	Yes	Yes	No	Yes	Yes v5	Yes	Yes (2.6)	Yes
Windows Server 2016	Yes	Yes	Yes	No	Yes	Yes v5	Yes	Yes (2.6)	Yes

=== Windows Phone ===
	FAT12	FAT16	FAT32	HPFS	ISO 9660	NTFS	UDF (More Info)	ReFS
Windows Phone 8	?	Yes	Yes	No	?	Yes v5	?	No
Windows Phone 8.1	?	Yes	Yes	No	?	Yes v5	?	No
Windows 10 Mobile	?	Yes	Yes	No	?	Yes v5	?	?

== Hardware requirements ==
Installing Windows requires an internal or external optical drive, or a USB flash drive. A keyboard and mouse are the recommended input devices, though some versions support a touchscreen. For operating systems prior to Vista, an optical drive must be capable of reading CD media, while in Windows Vista onwards, such a drive must be DVD-compatible. The drive may be detached after installing Windows.

=== Windows 9x ===
	CPU	RAM	Free disk space
Windows 95	386	4 MB	120 MB
Windows 98	486 DX2 66 MHz	16 MB	300 MB
Windows Me (Millennium Edition)	Pentium 150 MHz	32 MB	400 MB

=== Windows NT ===
Version	CPU	RAM		Free disk space	Video adapter and monitor
Version	CPU	Minimum	Recommended	Free disk space	Video adapter and monitor
Windows NT 3.1	386, 25 MHz	12 MB	16 MB	75 MB	VGA (640x480)
Windows NT 3.5 Workstation	386, 25 MHz	8 MB	16 MB	90 MB	VGA (640x480)
Windows NT 3.51 Workstation	386, 25 MHz	8 MB	16 MB	90 MB	VGA (640x480)
Windows NT 4.0 Workstation	486, 33 MHz	12 MB	?	110 MB	VGA (640x480)
Windows 2000 Professional	133 MHz	32 MB	128 MB	650 MB	VGA (640x480)
Windows XP	233 MHz	64 MB	128 MB	1.5 GB	Super VGA (800x600)
Windows Fundamentals for Legacy PCs	233 MHz	64 MB	128 MB	500 MB	Super VGA (800x600)
Windows XP 64-Bit Edition	700 MHz Itanium	1 GB	?	6 GB	Super VGA (800x600)
Windows Server 2003	1 GHz (x86) or 1.4 GHz (x64)	128 MB	256 MB	2 GB (x86); 4 GB (x64)	Super VGA (800x600)
Windows Vista	800 MHz	384 MB (Starter); 512 MB (others)	2 GB	15 GB (~6.5 GB for OS)	Super VGA (800x600); WDDM & DirectX 9 for Aero
Windows Server 2008	1 GHz (x86) or 1.4 GHz (x64)	384 MB (Starter); 512 MB (others)	2 GB	10 GB	Super VGA (800x600); WDDM & DirectX 9 for Aero
Windows 7	1 GHz	1 GB (x86); 2 GB (x64)	4 GB	16 GB (x86); 20 GB (x64) (~6.5 GB for OS)	Super VGA (800x600); WDDM & DirectX 9 for Aero
Windows Server 2012	1.4 GHz (x86-64)	512 MB	1 GB	10 GB	Super VGA (800x600), 32-bit color
Windows 8	1 GHz	1 GB (x86); 2 GB (x64)	4 GB	16 GB (x86); 20 GB (x64) (~6.5 GB for OS)	Super VGA (800x600), 32-bit color 1024 x 768 for Windows Store apps 1366 x 768 to snap apps
Windows 8.1	1 GHz	1 GB (x86); 2 GB (x64)	4 GB	16 GB (x86); 20 GB (x64) (~6.5 GB for OS)	Super VGA (800x600), 32-bit color 1024 x 768 for Windows Store apps 1366 x 768 to snap apps
Windows 10	1 GHz or faster processor or SoC	1 GB (x86); 2 GB (x64)	4 GB	16 GB (x86); 20 GB (x64)	Super VGA (800x600), 32-bit color
Windows Server 2016	1.4 GHz 64-bit processor	512 MB ECC memory 2 GB with Desktop Experience installed	depends on role	32 GB (~10 GB for OS)	XGA (1024 x 768)
Windows Server 2019	1.4 GHz 64-bit processor	512 MB ECC memory 2 GB with Desktop Experience installed	depends on role	32 GB (~10 GB for OS)	XGA (1024 x 768)
Windows Server 2022	1.4 GHz 64-bit processor	512 MB ECC memory 2 GB with Desktop Experience installed	depends on role	32 GB (~10 GB for OS)	XGA (1024 x 768)
Windows 11	64-bit 1 GHz or faster processor or SoC with two or more cores	4 GB	8-16 GB	64 GB (~10 GB for OS)	720p greater than 9" diagonally, 32-bit color
Windows Server 2025	1.4 GHz 64-bit processor	512 MB ECC memory 2 GB with Desktop Experience installed	4 GB with Desktop Experience installed	32 GB	720p greater than 9" diagonally, 32-bit color

=== Windows Phone ===
Version	CPU	RAM		Free disk space	Video adapter and monitor
Version	CPU	Minimum	Recommended	Free disk space	Video adapter and monitor
Windows Phone 7	800 MHz	256 MB	—N/a	4 GB	Wide VGA (800 × 480)
Windows Phone 8	1 GHz	512 MB	—N/a	8 GB	Wide VGA (800 × 480)
Windows Phone 8.1	1 GHz	512 MB	—N/a	4 GB	Wide VGA (800 × 480)
Windows 10 Mobile	1 GHz	1 GB	2 GB	8 GB	Wide VGA (800 × 480)

== Physical memory limits ==
Maximum limits on physical memory (RAM) that Windows can address vary depending on both the Windows version and between IA-32 and x64 versions.

=== Windows ===
Operating system	Limit on Real Mode	Limit on Standard Mode	Limit on Enhanced Mode
Windows 1.0x	640 KB	—N/a	—N/a
Windows 2.0x	640 KB	—N/a	16MB
Windows 2.1x	640 + 64 KB	—N/a	16MB
Windows 3.0x	640 + 64 KB	16MB	16MB
Windows 3.1x	—N/a	256MB	256MB
Windows 95	—N/a	—N/a	944MB
Windows 98	—N/a	—N/a	1GB
Windows Me	—N/a	—N/a	1.5GB

=== Windows NT ===
Operating system	Limit on 32-bit platforms	Limit in IA-64	Limit on x64
Windows NT 3.1	4 GB	—N/a	—N/a
Windows NT 3.5	4 GB	—N/a	—N/a
Windows NT 3.51	4 GB	—N/a	—N/a
Windows NT 4.0	4 GB	—N/a	—N/a
Windows 2000 Professional/Server	4 GB	—N/a	—N/a
Windows 2000 Advanced Server	8 GB	—N/a	—N/a
Windows 2000 Datacenter	32 GB	—N/a	—N/a
Windows XP Starter	512 MB	—N/a	—N/a
Windows XP Home	4 GB	—N/a	—N/a
Windows XP Professional	4 GB	128 GB	128 GB
Windows Server 2003 RTM Web	2 GB	—N/a	—N/a
Windows Server 2003 RTM Standard/Small Business	4 GB	—N/a	—N/a
Windows Server 2003 RTM Enterprise/Datacenter	64 GB	512 GB	—N/a
Windows Compute Cluster Server 2003	—N/a	32 GB	—N/a
Windows Server 2003 R1/SP1 Standard	4 GB	—N/a	32 GB
Windows Server 2003 R1/SP1 Enterprise/Datacenter	64 GB	1 TB	1 TB
Windows Server 2003 R1/SP2 Standard	4GB	—N/a	32 GB
Windows Server 2003 R1/SP2 Enterprise/Datacenter	64 GB	2 TB	1 TB
Windows Server 2003 R2/SP1 Standard	4 GB	—N/a	32 GB
Windows Server 2003 R2/SP1 Enterprise/Datacenter	64 GB	—N/a	1 TB
Windows Vista Starter	1 GB	—N/a	—N/a
Windows Vista Home Basic	4 GB	—N/a	8 GB
Windows Vista Home Premium	4 GB	—N/a	16 GB
Windows Vista Business/Enterprise/Ultimate	4 GB	—N/a	128 GB
Windows Home Server	4 GB	—N/a	—N/a
Windows Server 2008 Web Server/Standard/Small Business	4 GB	—N/a	32 GB
Windows HPC Server 2008	—N/a	—N/a	128 GB
Windows Server 2008 Enterprise/Datacenter	64 GB	—N/a	1 TB
Windows Server 2008 for Itanium–Based Systems	—N/a	2 TB	—N/a
Windows 7 Starter	2 GB	—N/a	—N/a
Windows 7 Home Basic	4 GB	—N/a	8 GB
Windows 7 Home Premium	4 GB	—N/a	16 GB
Windows 7 Professional/Enterprise/Ultimate	4 GB	—N/a	192 GB
Windows Server 2008 R2 Foundation	—N/a	—N/a	8 GB
Windows Server 2008 R2 Web Server/Standard	—N/a	—N/a	32 GB
Windows HPC Server 2008 R2	—N/a	—N/a	128 GB
Windows Server 2008 R2 Enterprise/Datacenter	—N/a	—N/a	2 TB
Windows Server 2008 R2 for Itanium–Based Systems	—N/a	2 TB	—N/a
Windows 8 (Core)	4 GB	—N/a	128 GB
Windows 8 Pro/Enterprise	4 GB	—N/a	512 GB
Windows RT	4 GB	—N/a	—N/a
Windows Server 2012 Standard/Datacenter	—N/a	—N/a	4 TB
Windows Storage Server 2012 Standard	—N/a	—N/a	4 TB
Windows Storage Server 2012 Workgroup	—N/a	—N/a	32 GB
Hyper-V Server 2012	—N/a	—N/a	4 TB
Windows 8.1 (Core)	4 GB	—N/a	128 GB
Windows 8.1 Pro/Enterprise	4 GB	—N/a	512 GB
Windows RT 8.1	4 GB	—N/a	—N/a
Windows 10 Mobile	4 GB	—N/a	—N/a
Windows 10 Home	4 GB	—N/a	128 GB
Windows 10 Pro	4 GB	—N/a	2 TB
Windows 10 Pro for Workstations	4 GB	—N/a	6 TB
Windows 10 Education	4 GB	—N/a	2 TB
Windows 10 Enterprise	4 GB	—N/a	6 TB
Windows Server 2016 Essentials	—N/a	—N/a	64 GB
Windows Server 2016 Standard	—N/a	—N/a	24 TB
Windows Server 2016 Datacenter	—N/a	—N/a	24 TB
Windows Server 2019 Essentials	—N/a	—N/a	64 GB
Windows Server 2019 Standard	—N/a	—N/a	24 TB
Windows Server 2019 Datacenter	—N/a	—N/a	24 TB
Windows Server 2022 Essentials	—N/a	—N/a	64 GB
Windows Server 2022 Standard	—N/a	—N/a	24 TB
Windows Server 2022 Datacenter	—N/a	—N/a	24 TB
Windows 11 Home	—N/a	—N/a	128 GB
Windows 11 Pro	—N/a	—N/a	2 TB
Windows 11 Pro for Workstations	—N/a	—N/a	6 TB
Windows 11 Education	—N/a	—N/a	2 TB
Windows 11 Enterprise	—N/a	—N/a	6 TB

== Security features ==
	Resource access control	Subsystem isolation mechanisms	Integrated firewall	Encrypted file systems	Defender	Windows Hello
Windows 2000	ACLs		TCP/IP Filtering, IPSec	Yes (NTFS only)	No	No
Windows XP	ACLs	Win32 WindowStation, Desktop, Job objects	Windows Firewall (from SP2), TCP/IP Filtering, IPSec	Yes (NTFS only)	Optional	No
Windows Server 2003	ACLs, Privileges, RBAC	Win32 WindowStation, Desktop, Job objects	Windows Firewall, TCP/IP Filtering, IPSec	Yes	Optional	No
Windows Vista	ACLs, Privileges, RBAC	Win32 WindowStation, Desktop, Job objects	Windows Firewall, TCP/IP Filtering, IPSec	Yes	Yes	No
Windows Server 2008	ACLs, Privileges, RBAC	Win32 WindowStation, Desktop, Job objects	Windows Firewall, TCP/IP Filtering, IPSec	Yes	Yes	No
Windows 7	ACLs, Privileges, RBAC	Win32 WindowStation, Desktop, Job objects	Windows Firewall, TCP/IP Filtering, IPSec	Yes	Yes	No
Windows Server 2012	ACLs, Privileges, RBAC	Win32 WindowStation, Desktop, Job objects	Windows Firewall, TCP/IP Filtering, IPSec	Yes	Yes	No
Windows 8	ACLs, Privileges, RBAC	Win32 WindowStation, Desktop, Job objects	Windows Firewall, TCP/IP Filtering, IPSec	Yes	Yes	No
Windows Server 2012 R2	ACLs, Privileges, RBAC	Win32 WindowStation, Desktop, Job objects	Windows Firewall, TCP/IP Filtering, IPSec	Yes	Yes	No
Windows 8.1	ACLs, Privileges, RBAC	Win32 WindowStation, Desktop, Job objects	Windows Firewall, TCP/IP Filtering, IPSec	Yes	Yes	No
Windows 10	ACLs, Privileges, RBAC	Win32 WindowStation, Desktop, Job objects	Windows Firewall, TCP/IP Filtering, IPSec	Yes	Yes	Yes
Windows Server 2016	ACLs, Privileges, RBAC	Win32 WindowStation, Desktop, Job objects	Windows Firewall, TCP/IP Filtering, IPSec	Yes	Yes	Yes

== Features ==
Version	Shell	Visual styles	Browser	Web server	Windows Media Player	Command-line interpreter
Windows 1.0	MS-DOS executive	(Unnamed)	—N/a	—N/a	—N/a	—N/a
Windows 2.0	MS-DOS executive	(Unnamed)	—N/a	—N/a	—N/a	—N/a
Windows 3.0	Program Manager	(Unnamed)	—N/a	—N/a	3.0 (Multimedia Extension edition only)	—N/a
Windows 3.1x	Program Manager	(Unnamed)	—N/a	—N/a	3.1	—N/a
Windows 95	Windows shell	Classic	Internet Explorer 1 in OEM RTM; Internet Explorer 2 in OSR1; Internet Explorer 3 in OSR2 and OSR2.1; Internet Explorer 4 in OSR2.5	—N/a	4.0	COMMAND.COM
Windows NT 4.0	Windows shell	Classic	Internet Explorer 2 Internet Explorer 3 (in some localized editions)	PWS	4.0	COMMAND.COM, cmd.exe
Windows 98	Windows shell	Classic	Internet Explorer 4.01	PWS	4.0	COMMAND.COM
Windows 98 SE	Windows shell	Classic	Internet Explorer 5	PWS	4.0	COMMAND.COM
Windows 2000	Windows shell	Classic	Internet Explorer 5.01	IIS 5.0	5.0 and 6.4 (side by side)	COMMAND.COM, cmd.exe
Windows Me	Windows shell	Classic	Internet Explorer 5.5	—N/a	6.4 and 7.0 (side by side)	COMMAND.COM
Windows XP	Windows shell	Luna (default), Classic	Internet Explorer 6	IIS 5.1	5.1, 6.4 and 8 (in RTM); 5.1, 6.4 and 9 (in SP2)	COMMAND.COM, cmd.exe, PowerShell (optional)
Windows Server 2003	Windows shell	Classic (default), Luna	Internet Explorer 6	IIS 6.0	9 (in RTM), 10 (in SP1)	COMMAND.COM, cmd.exe, PowerShell (optional)
Windows Vista	Windows shell	Aero (default), Classic	Internet Explorer 7	IIS 7	11	COMMAND.COM, cmd.exe, PowerShell (optional)
Windows Server 2008	Windows shell, Server Core	Classic (default), Aero (via "Desktop Experience")	Internet Explorer 7	IIS 7	11 (enabled by installing "Desktop Experience")	COMMAND.COM, cmd.exe, PowerShell (optional)
Windows 7	Windows shell	Aero (default), Classic	Internet Explorer 8	IIS 7.5	12	COMMAND.COM, cmd.exe, PowerShell 2.0
Windows Server 2008 R2	Windows shell, Server Core	Classic (default), Aero (via "Desktop Experience")	Internet Explorer 8	IIS 7.5	12 (via "Desktop Experience")	cmd.exe, PowerShell 2.0
Windows Server 2012	Windows shell, Server Core	Metro	Internet Explorer 10	IIS 8	12 (via "Desktop Experience")	cmd.exe, PowerShell 3.0
Windows 8	Windows shell	Metro	Internet Explorer 10	IIS 8	12	COMMAND.COM, cmd.exe, PowerShell 3.0
Windows Server 2012 R2	Windows shell, Windows server core	Metro	Internet Explorer 11	IIS 8.5	12 (via "Desktop Experience")	cmd.exe, PowerShell 4.0
Windows 8.1	Windows shell	Metro	Internet Explorer 11	IIS 8.5	12	COMMAND.COM, cmd.exe, PowerShell 4.0
Windows 10	Windows shell	Metro	Internet Explorer 11; Microsoft Edge	IIS 10.0	12	COMMAND.COM, cmd.exe, PowerShell 5.0
Windows Server 2016	Windows shell, Windows server core	Metro	Internet Explorer 11; Microsoft Edge	IIS 10.0	12 (via "Desktop Experience")	cmd.exe, PowerShell 5.1
Windows Server 2019	Windows shell, Windows server core	Metro	Internet Explorer 11; Microsoft Edge	IIS 10.0	12 (via "Desktop Experience")	cmd.exe, PowerShell 5.1
Windows Server 2022	Windows shell, Windows server core	Metro	Internet Explorer 11; Microsoft Edge	IIS 10.0	12 (via "Desktop Experience")	cmd.exe, PowerShell 5.1
Windows 11	Windows shell	Mica	Internet Explorer 11(Hidden); Microsoft Edge	IIS 10.0	12 (2022)	COMMAND.COM, cmd.exe, PowerShell v.1

== Timeline ==
Timeline of Windows versions

== See also ==
=== Other lists ===
- List of Microsoft Windows versions
- List of operating systems
- Comparison of operating systems
- Comparison of operating system kernels
- Comparison of Windows Vista and Windows XP
- Microsoft Windows version history
- Comparison of DOS operating systems
- Architecture of Windows NT
- List of Microsoft codenames

=== Windows clones and emulators ===
- Freedows OS–Windows clone
- ReactOS–project to develop an operating system that is binary compatible with application software and device drivers for Microsoft Windows NT version 5.x
- Wine (software)–compatibility layer which allows to execute programs that were originally written for Microsoft Windows
