= Comparison of Windows Vista and Windows XP =

Differences and similarities between Windows Vista and Windows XP

Windows XP and Windows Vista differ considerably in regards to their security architecture, networking technologies, management and administration, shell and user interface, and mobile computing. Windows XP has suffered criticism for security problems and issues with performance. Vista has received criticism for issues with performance and product activation. Another common criticism of Vista concerns the integration of new forms of DRM into the operating system, and User Account Control (UAC) security technology.

== Compatibility ==
Windows Vista faces backward compatibility problems with a number of games and utility programs that work in Windows XP. As of August 2007, there were about 2,000 applications that specifically carried the 'Vista Compatibility Logo', although the majority of applications without the logo will run without any problems. This number is low compared to the number of programs that were compatible with XP in 2007, either natively or under emulation.

== Performance ==
Initial performance tests have demonstrated that Windows XP outperforms Vista in several productivity areas. File copy operations are speculated to be one area where Vista performs better than XP. In a test run by CRN Test Center, a 1.25 GB file was copied from a network share to each desktop. For XP, it took 2 minutes and 54 seconds, for Vista with SP1 it took 2 minutes and 29 seconds. The Vista implementation of the file copy is arguably more complete and correct as the file does not register as being transferred until it has completely transferred; in Windows XP, the file completed dialogue box is displayed prior to the file actually finishing its copy or transfer, with the file completing after the dialogue is displayed. This can cause an issue if the storage device is ejected prior to the file being successfully transferred or copied in Windows XP due to the dialogue box's premature prompt.

Another test was performed by Tom's Hardware in January 2007. Applications such as Unreal Tournament 2004 and the graphics benchmarking suite SPECviewperf 9.03 suffered heavily from the lack of support for the OpenGL graphics library under Vista. They reached the conclusion that Windows Vista clearly is not a great new performer when it comes to executing single applications at maximum speed. On the other hand, they did not find evidence that Windows Vista's Desktop Window Manager (DWM) consumes more energy than Windows XP's window manager. All of the tests were performed on a computer with a 2.93 GHz Intel Core 2 Extreme X6800 processor, 2× 1024 MB DDR2-800 RAM, HIS Radeon X1900XTX IceQ3 graphics card, 150 GB Western Digital WD1500ADFD hard drive and a Gigabyte GA-965P-DQ6 motherboard.

A paper evaluating the performance of Windows operating systems concluded that Windows Vista did not provide a better overall performance on the high-end computer system compared to Windows XP. Some performance improvements could be seen in memory management and graphics display, but other parts of OS have equal or lower performance than Windows XP. On a low-end computer system, Windows XP outperformed Windows Vista in most tested areas. Windows OS network performance depends on the packet size and used protocol. However, in general, Windows Vista compared to Windows XP shows better network performance particularly for the medium-sized packets.

== Security ==
Security was a top priority during Windows Vista development. In Windows XP, every user is set up as an administrator by default (unless added through Computer Management). As a result, most home users ran all their software with Administrator access. However, this left most users unwittingly open to potential security threats, such as hacking and malware downloads. A large amount of existing software doesn't run well as a standard user, due to developers not implementing the principle of least privilege in their design and testing. For example, a number of poorly written applications often assume incorrectly that they will have read and write access to the entire filesystem and system Registry. Denying such an application access to any of these assumed rights can cause the application to fail. Sometimes, a person logged on as a standard user under Windows XP can't perform user-specific tasks such as changing the system clock and calendar, changing the computer's time zone, or changing the computer's power management settings due to so-called "LUA (Least-Privilege User Account) bugs". User Account Control in Windows Vista improves this by limiting application software to standard user privileges until an administrator authorizes an increase in privilege level. In this way, UAC prevents users from making inadvertent changes to system settings and locks down the computer to prevent unauthorized applications from installing or performing malicious actions. Windows Vista is able to work around multiple LUA bugs in third-party applications with its file and Registry virtualisation feature, as well as application compatibility shims. Internet Explorer 7's Protected Mode utilizes User Account Control to isolate IE from other applications and prevent it from writing content to any location, except the Temporary Internet Files folder. Internet Explorer 7 is available for XP, but does not support Protected Mode on XP. Windows Vista also includes Windows Defender, a spyware scanning and removal tool that is also available for Windows XP for free. Enterprise and Ultimate editions of Windows Vista include BitLocker Drive Encryption, which aims to help protect data in the case of stolen devices.

Vista implements address space layout randomization, that makes it considerably more difficult for malicious code to exploit Return-to-libc attacks than on previous versions of Windows, particularly on 64-bit systems. Furthermore, Vista implements heap management enhancements that make it much more difficult to carry out buffer overflow attacks.

64-bit editions of Windows Vista require all kernel-mode drivers to be digitally signed, initially making it difficult for rootkits to install until Alureon managed to overcome this obstacle in 2010 by subverting the master boot record.

The firewall in Vista has been rewritten, allowing both outbound as well as inbound traffic to be blocked.

Feature	Windows XP	Windows Vista	Windows 7	Windows 8.x	Windows 10	Windows 11
Windows Defender	Available as a free download	Yes		Yes (added antivirus capabilities, available in older versions as the Microsoft Security Essentials download)		
Windows Firewall	Yes					
Windows Security Center	Yes (starting with SP2)	Yes	Yes (replaced by Action Center)		Yes (replaced by Security and Maintenance)	
BitLocker Drive Encryption	Only viewing contents	Yes (Ultimate and Enterprise editions only)		Yes (Pro and Enterprise editions only)	Yes (Pro, Education and Enterprise editions only)	
Parental controls	Some (Internet Explorer allows parental control of web browsing)	Yes		Yes (replaced by Family Safety)		
User Account Control	No	Yes				
Data Execution Prevention	Yes (starting with SP2)	Yes				

== Shell and user interface ==
=== Visual styles ===
Luna is the default visual style in Windows XP. It is available in three color schemes: Blue (default), Olive Green, and Silver. Windows XP Media Center Edition comes with Royale as the default theme.

In most editions of Windows Vista, the default theme is Windows Aero. Aero offers translucent window effects, as well as live thumbnails, animated transitions and Flip 3D. However, it requires a compatible graphics card, with a WDDM driver, DirectX 9 support and 32-bit color; otherwise, Windows Vista is displayed using the "Windows Vista Basic" visual style.

== See also ==
- Comparison of operating systems
- Comparison of Microsoft Windows versions
- Features new to Windows Vista
- Features removed from Windows Vista
