= Kindel =

Surname list

Kindel is the surname of the following people

- Ben Kindel (born 2007), Canadian ice hockey player
- Charlie Kindel, American tech executive
- George John Kindel (1855-1930), American politician
- Steve Kindel (born in 1977), Canadian soccer player

== Pseudonym ==
- Joaquín del Palacio (Kindel) (1905-1989), Spanish photographer

== See also ==
- Kindl, a surname
