= Kindl =

Kindl may refer to:

- Gabriella Kindl, Hungarian and Montenegrin handball player
- Ivana Kindl, Croatian singer
- Jakub Kindl, Czech ice hockey player
- Manuel Kindl, German ice hockey player
- Patrice Kindl, American novelist
- Wolfgang Kindl, Austrian luger

== See also ==
- Münchner Kindl, found on the Munich coat of arms
- Kindel, a surname
