= Windows Embedded Industry =

Industrial embedded operating system by Microsoft

- Version of the Windows Embedded operating system
- Screenshot of Windows Embedded 8.1 Industry Pro
- Developer: Microsoft Corporation
- Working state: Publicly released / Trialware
- Source model: Closed-source; Source-available (through Shared Source Initiative)
- Latest release: 8.1 with Update (v6.3.9600) / April 16, 2014; 12 years ago
- Kernel type: Hybrid
- Default user interface: Graphical
- License: Proprietary commercial software
- Succeeded by: Windows IoT Enterprise
- Official website: Windows Embedded 8.1 Industry (archived at Wayback Machine)

Support status
- Unsupported
- Windows Embedded for Point of Service (WEPOS): Mainstream support ended on April 12, 2011; Extended support ended on April 12, 2016
- Windows Embedded POSReady 2009: Mainstream support ended on April 8, 2014; Extended support ended on April 9, 2019
- Windows Embedded POSReady 7: Mainstream support ended on October 11, 2016; Extended support ended on October 12, 2021; Windows Embedded POSReady 7 was eligible for the paid Extended Security Updates (ESU) program. This program allowed users to purchase security updates for 3 years, in yearly installments. Security Updates were available until October 8, 2024
- Windows Embedded 8 Industry: Unsupported as of January 12, 2016; users must install Windows Embedded 8.1 Industry in order to continue receiving updates and support.
- Windows Embedded 8.1 Industry: Mainstream support ended on July 10, 2018; Extended support ended on July 11, 2023

Windows Embedded Industry, formerly Windows Embedded POSReady and Windows Embedded for Point of Service (WEPOS), is an operating system developed by Microsoft as part of its Windows Embedded family of products. Based on Windows NT, Windows Embedded Industry is designed for use in industrial devices such as cash registers, automated teller machines, and self service checkouts.

Windows Embedded 8.1 Industry was the last release, with Windows IoT Enterprise superseding Windows Embedded Industry, Windows Embedded Standard, and Windows For Embedded Systems (FES).

== Releases ==
=== Windows Embedded for Point of Service (WEPOS) ===
A screenshot of Windows Embedded for Point of Service. It is very similar to Windows XP apart from it using the Windows Classic theme.

Windows Embedded for Point of Service was released on May 24, 2005, nearly a year after its Windows XP SP2 counterpart was launched by Microsoft in August 2004. WEPOS expanded Microsoft's Windows Embedded family of products. It was the first edition of Windows Embedded that could use the Windows Update Agent to update an installed and deployed image. Service Pack 3 (SP3) for WEPOS was released on October 8, 2008. Mainstream support ended on April 12, 2011, and extended support ended on April 12, 2016. When the new Microsoft Lifecycle Support policy for Internet Explorer went into effect on January 12, 2016, IE6 support was dropped from not only WEPOS, but all other supported platforms.

=== Windows Embedded POSReady 2009 ===
A screenshot of Windows Embedded POSReady 2009. It is very similar to Windows XP apart from its default visual style, called Embedded.

Windows Embedded POSReady 2009 offers more features over Windows Embedded for Point of Service such as Full Localization, Internet Explorer 7 and XPS support if .NET Framework 3.5 or higher is installed. This edition was released on December 9, 2008, exactly seven months after its Windows XP SP3 counterpart was launched on May 6, 2008. Prior to XP's end of support, some Windows XP users have reported that editing the registry on their operating system can 'trick' Windows Update into accepting updates targeting POSReady 2009. POSReady 2009 is also notable as being the last XP-derived operating system to receive official support from Microsoft. Starting in 2017, Microsoft announced end of support for POSReady 2009. Mainstream support for Windows Embedded POSReady 2009—the last supported edition of Windows based on Windows XP—ended on April 8, 2014, and extended support ended on April 9, 2019, marking the overall end of all security updates for the Windows XP codebase after almost 18 years.

=== Windows Embedded POSReady 7 ===
A screenshot of Windows Embedded POSReady 7. It is almost identical to Windows 7 with no real changes (apart from the login screen and branding), and has the Windows Aero theme by default.

Windows Embedded POSReady 7, which is based on Windows 7 with SP1, was released on July 1, 2011, nearly two years after Windows 7 debuted. It is the last supported edition of Windows based on Windows 7 to receive official support from Microsoft. Mainstream support for Windows Embedded POSReady 7 ended on October 11, 2016 and extended support ended on October 12, 2021. That date marked the final end of extended support for the Windows 7 codebase after more than 12 years. Windows Embedded POSReady 7 was eligible for the paid Extended Security Updates (ESU) program. This service was available via OEMs, in yearly installments. Security updates were available for the operating system until October 8, 2024. This marked the final end of IA-32 updates on the Windows NT 6.1 product line after more than 15 years, as well as marking the final end of all support for the Windows Embedded Industry subfamily after more than 19 years.

=== Windows Embedded 8 Industry ===
A screenshot of Windows Embedded 8 Industry. It is almost identical to Windows 8 with no real changes (apart from the branding), and uses the Metro version of the Windows Aero theme.

Based on Windows 8, Windows Embedded 8 Industry was released on April 2, 2013 and is available in Pro, Pro Retail, and Enterprise editions. The Pro and Pro Retail editions are only available pre-installed on OEM devices, while the Enterprise edition is available through the volume licensing channel only. The Pro Retail edition adds a few extra features for use in retail environments, while the Enterprise edition provides embedded-specific features designed to integrate seamlessly with Windows 8 Enterprise. Alaska Airlines uses Windows Embedded 8 Industry in-flight entertainment devices. It is unsupported as of January 12, 2016.

=== Windows Embedded 8.1 Industry ===
Based on Windows 8.1, Windows Embedded 8.1 Industry was released on October 17, 2013, by Microsoft as a component of the operating system itself. As with 8 Industry, it is available in Pro, Pro Retail, and Enterprise editions. Windows Embedded 8.1 Industry Update was released on April 16, 2014. Mainstream support for Windows Embedded 8.1 Industry ended on July 10, 2018, and extended support ended on July 11, 2023. This marked the final end of "extended support" for the Windows Embedded Industry subfamily after almost 18 years. Unlike with Windows Embedded POSReady 7, however, Windows Embedded 8.1 Industry (along with all other editions of Windows 8.1) was not eligible for the Extended Security Updates (ESU) program, despite its server counterpart being eligible for ESU.

=== Windows IoT Enterprise ===
Microsoft rebranded "Windows Embedded" to "Windows IoT" starting with the release of embedded editions of Windows 10. Windows IoT Enterprise acts as the successor to Windows Embedded Industry.

== System requirements ==
System requirements
OS	RAM	HDD
Windows Embedded for Point of Service	64 MB	380 MB
Windows Embedded POSReady 2009	64 MB	480 MB
Windows Embedded POSReady 7	1 GB	16 GB
Windows Embedded 8 Industry	1 GB	16 GB
Windows Embedded 8.1 Industry	1 GB	16 GB
