= Desktop Architect =

Operating system customization software

- Developer: Ken A. Foster
- Stable release: 2.11 / 2001
- Operating system: Windows 95, Windows 98, Windows 2000 (partially compatible with Windows XP)
- License: Proprietary

Desktop Architect is a third-party replacement for the Desktop Themes control panel in Windows 95, 98, ME and 2000. It is also fully compatible with Windows XP and Vista. However, in Vista, the startup sound does not work, and the Network Neighborhood icon has to be changed manually. It is not known at this time if this program works with Windows 7.

On Windows 8.1 (Pro 64-bit) the fonts may be garbled to the point the system is rendered unusable.

Changing the desktop colors (windows borders, 3D object bevels, scrollbar, etc.) do work, but the problem with text display is hard to correct since all Windows' and its applications screens are affected, and even rebooting or rolling back to a previous system restore point may be difficult.

Caution is advised; since Desktop Architect allows the user to select which changes to apply, making small changes and testing the results in steps, like marking only the Colors checkbox, is recommended.

== Features ==
=== Appearance ===
Appearance allows users to customize the Windows Classic theme by changing the colour of various objects, such as scrollbars, active and inactive windows, menu bar, message box, window borders, window frame, selected items, font colours, 3D objects, and a few other things as well.

=== Wallpaper ===
Users can change the desktop wallpaper image.

=== Sounds ===
Systems sounds can be customized and changed. Default sounds can be removed, or can be changed to a different sound file. When browsing for sound files users can preview the sound.

=== Icons ===
Users can change the system icons, or restore default icons. These include folder icons, printers, My Documents, My Computer, Recycle Bin, Network Neighborhood, and more. It can also import and install 3rd party icon packages.

=== Pointers ===
The mouse pointers can be changed with custom cursor files, or restored to default cursors. Animated cursors can be used, also.

=== Screen Savers ===
Screen savers can be changed or imported, and saved with the theme file.

=== Wizards ===
Desktop Architect has two wizards, the Theme Package Wizard, and the Theme Install Wizard. The Theme Package Wizard compresses the theme into a ZIP file for distribution. The Theme Install Wizard imports and installs themes downloaded from another source.

=== Theme Scheduler ===
This features allows user to have themes automatically set at a specific time of year.

== Requirements ==
Desktop Architect requires version 4.2 or higher of the Windows library file COMCTL32.DLL, which is located in the computer's System folder. It also requires 64MB of RAM and 16-bit 1024x768 Video graphics.
