= Windows Home Server 2011 =

Home server operating system by Microsoft released in 2011

- Version of the Windows NT operating system

- Windows Home Server 2011 desktop
- Developer: Microsoft
- Source model: Closed-source; Source-available (through Shared Source Initiative)
- Released to manufacturing: 6 April 2011; 15 years ago
- Latest release: 6.1.8800
- Update method: Windows Update
- Supported platforms: x86-64
- Kernel type: Hybrid
- License: Proprietary commercial software
- Preceded by: Windows Home Server (2007)
- Succeeded by: Windows Server 2012 Essentials (2012)
- Official website: www.microsoft.com/windows/homeserver

Support status
- Unsupported as of 12 April 2016

Windows Home Server 2011 Dashboard

Windows Home Server 2011, code named Vail, is a home server operating system by Microsoft designed for small office/home offices and homes with multiple connected PCs to offer protected file storage, file sharing, automated PC backup, remote access, and remote control of PC desktops. It was released on 6 April 2011 following the release of Power Pack 3 for its aging predecessor, Windows Home Server. Windows Home Server 2011 is the last Windows Home Server release and was succeeded by Windows Server 2012 Essentials.

Windows Home Server 2011 is based on Windows Server 2008 R2 and requires x86-64 CPUs (64-bit), while its predecessor worked on the older IA-32 (32-bit) architecture as well. Coupled with fundamental changes in the structure of the client backups and the shared folders, there is no clear method for migrating from the previous version to Windows Home Server 2011.

== Features ==
Windows Home Server 2011 includes additional entertainment capabilities, and an add in feature with an app store. Including web-based media functionality.

Initial speculation by technology columnist Mary Jo Foley fueled the idea that 'Vail' would integrate with Windows Media Center. This prompted the response "Time will tell" by Microsoft Windows Home Server Product Planner Todd Headrick, but by the time of the public beta Microsoft had decided not to integrate Windows Media Center with 'Vail'.

=== System requirements ===
System requirements
Component	Required specifications
CPU	1.3 GHz dual core or 1.4 GHz single core; x86-64 architecture
RAM	2 GB (8 GB Maximum)
Hard disk space	At least one 160 GB drive

=== Drive Extender removal ===
On 23 November 2010, Microsoft announced that Drive Extender would be removed from Windows Home Server 2011. This announcement has led to "astonishment and outrage" from testers and users. Criticism of Drive Extender's removal is mainly related to it being seen as a core feature of Windows Home Server and a key reason for adoption. Windows Home Server 2011 developer Michael Leworthy expressed concern that the implementation of Drive Extender might lead to "data error issues." As a result, third-party products entered the market to fill the void left by Drive Extender, including Drive Bender (Division M) and DrivePool (StableBit).

The volume spanning feature of Drive Extender, in which two or more drives are used as one large storage volume, is available using the Dynamic Disks feature as in any other Windows Server release.
