= Windows Home Server =

Home server operating system by Microsoft released in 2007

- Version of the Windows NT operating system

- Screenshot of Windows Home Server
- Developer: Microsoft
- Source model: Closed-source; Source-available (through Shared Source Initiative)
- Released to manufacturing: 4 November 2007; 19 years ago
- Final release: 5.2.4500 (Power Pack 3) / 24 November 2009; 16 years ago
- Kernel type: Hybrid
- License: Proprietary commercial software
- Succeeded by: Windows Home Server 2011 (2011)
- Official website: www.microsoft.com/windows/products/winfamily/windowshomeserver/default.mspx

Support status
- Unsupported as of 8 January 2013

Windows Home Server (code-named Quattro) is a home server operating system from Microsoft. It was announced on 7 January 2007 at the Consumer Electronics Show by Bill Gates, released to manufacturing on 16 July 2007 and officially released on 4 November 2007.

Windows Home Server was based on Windows Server 2003 R2 and was intended to be a solution for homes with multiple connected PCs to offer file sharing, automated backups, print server, and remote access. It is paired with the Windows Home Server Console—client software accessed from another computer on the network to provide a graphical management interface.

Power Pack 1 for Windows Home Server was released on 20 July 2008. Power Pack 2 was released on 24 March 2009 and Power Pack 3 was released on 24 November 2009.

Windows Home Server 2011, the next version of this operating system, was released on 6 April 2011. Microsoft confirmed Windows Home Server 2011 to be the last release in the Windows Home Server product line.

Windows Home Server was the brainchild of Charlie Kindel who was the General Manager for the product from 2005 through 2009.

Microsoft ended support for Windows Home Server on 8 January 2013.

== Features ==
- 10 computers and 10 users: Allows a maximum of ten user accounts to be created on the server console and ten computers to have WHS connector installed, without any client access licenses.
- Centralized backup: Allows backup of up to 10 PCs, using Single-instance storage technology to avoid multiple copies of the same file, even if that file exists on multiple PCs.
- Health monitoring: Can centrally track the health of all PCs on the network, including antivirus and firewall status.
- File sharing: Creates and operates network shares for computers to store the files remotely, acting as a network-attached storage device. Separate categories are provided for common file types like Documents, Music, Pictures and Videos. The files are indexed for fast searching.
- Printer sharing: Allows a print server to handle print jobs for all users.
- Shadow Copy: Uses Volume Shadow Copy Service to take point in time snapshots that allow older versions of files to be recovered.
- Headless operation: No monitor or keyboard is required to manage the device. Remote administration is performed by using the Windows Home Server Console client software provided in the bundle. Remote Desktop Services connections to the server are supported while connected to the same LAN.
- Remote access gateway: Allows remote access to any connected PC on the network, including the server itself, over the Internet.
- Media streaming: Can stream media to an Xbox 360 or other devices supporting Windows Media Connect.
- Selective data redundancy: Guards against a single drive failure by duplicating selected data across multiple drives.
- Expandable storage: Provides a unified single and easily expandable storage space, removing the need for drive letters.
- Extensibility through add-ins: Add-ins allow third-party developers to extend the features and functionality of the server. Add-Ins can be developed using the Windows Home Server SDK, to provide additional services to the client computers or work with the data already on the server. Add-ins can also be ASP.NET applications, hosted in IIS 6 running on WHS.
- Server backup: Backs up files which are stored within shared folders on the server to an external hard drive.

== Technology ==
=== Home Server Console ===
The Windows Home Server Console

The configuration interface was designed to be user-friendly enough that it could be set up without prior knowledge of server administration. The configuration interface, called the Home Server Console, was delivered as a Remote Desktop Protocol application to remote PCs while the application ran on the server itself, the GUI was rendered on the remote system. The Home Server Console client application could be accessed from any Windows PC. The server itself required no video card or peripherals; it was designed to require only an Ethernet card and at least one Windows XP, Windows Vista or Windows 7 computer.

=== Drive Extender ===
Windows Home Server Drive Extender was a file-based replication system that provided three key capabilities:

- Multi-disk redundancy so that if any given disk failed, data was not lost
- Arbitrary storage expansion by supporting any type of hard disk drive (e.g. Serial ATA, USB, FireWire) in any mixture and capacity, similar in concept to JBOD
- A single folder namespace (no drive letters)

With Drive Extender, users could add larger capacity hard disk drives and then could offline lesser capacity drives to upgrade capacity online. For example, if the user was reaching capacity of the share with five terabytes of the six-terabyte capacity used with six one-terabyte drives then the user could offline one of the one-terabyte drives and physically replace it with a two-terabyte drive. The WHS automatically equalizes the redistribution of used space across all available drives on a regular basis. The offline process would compress the used data across the minimum amount of drives allowing for the removal of one of the lesser capacity drives. Once replaced with a drive of higher capacity the system will automatically redistribute used capacity among the pool to ensure space capacity on each drive.

Users (specifically those who configure a family's home server) dealt with storage at two levels: Shared Folders and Disks. The only concepts relevant regarding disks was whether they had been "added" to the home server's storage pool or not and whether the disk appeared healthy to the system or not. This was in contrast with Windows' Logical Disk Manager which requires a greater degree of technical understanding in order to correctly configure a RAID array.

Shared Folders had a name, a description, permissions, and a flag indicating whether duplication (redundancy) was on or off for that folder.

If duplication was on for a Shared Folder (which was the default on multi-disk Home Server systems and not applicable to single disk systems) then the files in that Shared Folder were duplicated and the effective storage capacity was halved. However, in situations where a user may not have wanted data duplicated (e.g. TV shows that had been archived to a Windows Home Server from a system running Windows Media Center), Drive Extender provided the capability to not duplicate such files if the server was short on capacity or manually mark a complete content store as not for duplication.

A known limitation of Drive Extender was that it in some cases changed timestamp of directories and files when data was moved around between disks. According to Microsoft this was expected behavior. This caused unexpected behavior when using clients that sort media based on date. Examples are XBMC, MediaPortal, and Squeezebox Server. The aforementioned programs worked fine with WHS; however, files may have appeared out of order due to this caveat.

==== Cancellation ====
On 23 November 2010, Microsoft announced that Drive Extender would be removed from Windows Home Server 2011. This led to public outcry in the announcement's comments section. Criticism of Drive Extender's removal mainly related to it being seen as a core feature of Windows Home Server and a key reason for adoption. As a replacement for Drive Extender, Microsoft stated that OEMs would use RAID on their Windows Home Server products.

=== Computer Backup and Restore ===
Windows Home Server Computer Backup automatically backs up all of the computers in a home to the server using an image-based system that ensures point-in-time-based restoration of either entire PCs or specific files and folders. Complete bare-metal restores are initiated through a restore bootable CD, file based restores are initiated through the WHS client software which allows the users to open a backup and "drag and drop" files from it. This technology uses Volume Shadow Services (VSS) technology on the client computer to take an image based backup of a running computer. Because the backup operates on data at the cluster level, single instancing can be performed to minimize the amount of data that travels over the network and that will ultimately be stored on the home server. This single instancing gives the server the ability to store only one instance of data, no matter if the data originated from another computer, another file, or even data within the same file.

Computer backup images are not duplicated on the server, so if a server hard drive fails, backups could be lost. The "Server Backup" feature added in Power Pack 1 does not include duplication of backup images.

=== Remote File Access ===
Web Interface showing the shared files UI

The system also offers an SSL secured web browser based interface over the Internet to the shared file stores. The release version offers access to the web interface via a free Windows Live-provided URL, which uses Dynamic DNS. The web interface also allows the uploading to and downloading of files from the content stores. However, there is a limit of 2 GB for a single batch of upload.

=== Remote Desktop Services ===
The system also supports Terminal Services Gateway, allowing remote control of the desktop of any Windows computer on the home network. Currently supported systems are those which would normally support Remote Desktop: Windows XP Professional, Tablet and Media Center editions, Windows Vista Business, Enterprise and Ultimate editions and Windows 7 Professional, Enterprise and Ultimate editions. The web interface also supports embedding the Remote Desktop ActiveX control, to provide remote access to home computers from within the web interface directly. Remote sessions can also connect to the Home Server console to configure the server over the internet.

=== Add-Ins ===
Windows Home Server allows for developers to publish community and commercial add-ins designed to enhance the Windows Home Server with added functionality. As of January 2010, nearly 100 of these add-ins have been developed for WHS, including applications for antivirus & security, backups, disk management, automation, media, network/power management, remote access, BitTorrent and more. The Windows Home Server SDK (Software Development Kit) provides developers with a set of APIs and tools to use when developing for and extending Windows Home Server.

== Compatibility ==
System requirements
Requirement	Requirements
x86
CPU	1.0 GHz Intel Pentium III (or equivalent)
Memory	512 MB
Free space	80 GB
Media	DVD drive or USB flash drive
Network	100 Mbit/s Ethernet
Input device(s)	Keyboard and mouse

Windows Home Server features integration with Windows XP (SP2 or newer), Windows Vista, and Windows 7 (after the release of Power Pack 3) through a software installation, either from a client CD or via a network share. The connector software may also be installed by accessing yourserver:55000 through a web browser, where a link is provided to download the connector software and to install troubleshooting tools. Files stored on Windows Home Server are also available through a Windows share, opening compatibility to a wide variety of operating systems. Also, the Administration console is available via Remote Desktop, allowing administration from unsupported platforms.

Windows Home Server does not support Microsoft Security Essentials.

64-bit Windows client support was introduced in Power Pack 1, though the Restore Wizard on the Windows Home Server Restore CD is unable to restore clients running 64-bit operating systems, due to the fact that the Restore CD does not support 64-bit drivers. Windows XP Professional x64 isn't officially supported. However, unofficial workarounds allow Connector software to work on XP x64.

Integration of the file sharing service as a location for Mac OS X's Time Machine was apparently being considered, but upon Mac OS X Leopard's release, Apple had removed the ability to use the SMB file sharing protocol for Time Machine backups. One WHS provider, HP, provides their own plug-in with their home server line capable of Time Machine backup to a home server.

Windows Home Server has not officially supported Domain Controller capability and cannot readily join a Windows Server domain. Wireless networking is supported.

Dedicated devices will have the operating system pre-installed and may be supplied with a server recovery disk which reloads the OS over a network connection. This is utilized on the HP MediaSmart Server, and the Fujitsu Siemens Scaleo Home Server.

== Resolved issues ==
=== File corruption ===
The first release of Windows Home Server, RTM (release to manufacturing), suffered from a file corruption flaw whereby files saved directly to or edited on shares on a WHS device could become corrupted. Only the files that had NTFS Alternate Data Streams were susceptible to the flaw. The flaw led to data corruption only when the server was under heavy load at the time when the file (with ADS) was being saved onto a share.

Backups of client PCs made by Windows Home Server were not susceptible to the flaw.

Even though the issue was first acknowledged in October 2007, Microsoft formally warned users of the seriousness of the flaw on 20 December 2007. Microsoft then issued a list of applications, including Windows Live Photo Gallery, Microsoft OneNote, Microsoft Outlook and SyncToy 2.0, which might have triggered the flaw if they were used to edit the files on a WHS share directly.

This issue was fixed by Power Pack 1, released on 21 July 2008.

=== No native backup ===
Windows Home Server RTM did not include a mechanism for backing up the server. Power Pack 1 added the ability to back up files stored on the Shared Folders, to an external drive. Users can also subscribe to 3rd-party online services, for a fee. However, there remains no way to back up the installed server operating system. Backing-up of the client backup database is available either manually using the instructions provided by Microsoft on page 24 of this document or can be done using the WHS BDBB add-in written by Alex Kuretz and available from this website.

== Pricing ==
While some hardware manufacturers have developed dedicated boxes, Microsoft has also released Windows Home Server under the OEM/System Builder license. In November 2008, Microsoft lowered the price of the WHS System Builder SKU to US$100.

Users can also choose to use an existing PC or build their own systems, which would include the use of WHS System Builder.

As of 23 March 2009, Microsoft has also made Windows Home Server available to MSDN and Microsoft Technet subscribers.

Some computer systems are available only with a bundled Windows Home Server license. As is the case with other versions of Windows it is possible to request a refund of the license fees paid for Windows Home Server.

== See also ==
- File server
- Media server
