= Joaquín del Palacio =

Spanish photographer

Joaquín del Palacio (Kindel) was a Spanish photographer who was born in Madrid in 1905 and died in Madrid in 1989. He changed his name to Kindel to adapt to the foreign names that were starting to work in Spain and so look modern too: KIN came from Joaquín and DEL was for the beginning of his last name. For him, taking pictures was "just a matter of look and shoot when he saw something he liked. And light, rather than technique".

== Photography ==
He did most of his work between 1940 and 1970. He started in 1939, taking pictures of devastated regions of Spain after the Spanish Civil War had finished. Those pictures were social and dramatic scenes according to that period of time.

Later, he began to travel around Spain working for the "Dirección General de Turismo" (General Tourism Office). He took pictures of people and landscapes of Spain in the 1950s. This was a kinder image of the reality.

Then he started working for the "Colegio de Arquitectos" (Architecture School) with pictures of buildings made by architects like Luis Martínez-Feduchi, Alejandro de la Sota and Josep Antoni Coderch. He also took pictures of the interior of the buildings.

He was a master of photography that was able to capture the correct natural light for each image.
