= Charlie Kindel =

American tech executive

Charlie Kindel is an American tech executive and former chief product and technology officer at SnapAV. He formerly held roles with Control4, Amazon, and Microsoft. Much of his career has been spent focused on smart home products.

== Early life and education ==
Kindel was born in Vail, Colorado. He earned a bachelor's degree in systems engineering from the University of Arizona in 1990.

== Career ==
Kindel joined Microsoft in 1990. He was named general manager of Windows Home Server in 2004, remaining in that position until 2009, when he became general manager of the Windows Phone developer experience.

In 2011, Kindel left Microsoft to create BizLogr, as chief executive officer. The calendar scheduling startup launched in 2012, and was later renamed FreeBusy. The company created the mileage-logging app MileLogr.

Kindel joined Amazon in 2013, becoming director of Alexa Smart Home, remaining there until April 2018.

In August 2018, he joined home automation systems provider Control4 as senior vice president of products and services. After Control4 merged with SnapAV, Kindel was named chief product and technology officer of SnapAV, remaining there until November 2020.
