= Manuel Kindl =

German ice hockey player

- Born: June 2, 1993 (age 31); Augsburg, Germany
- Height: 1.90 m (6 ft 3 in)
- Weight: 92 kg (203 lb; 14 st 7 lb)
- Position: Defence
- Shot: Left
- Played for: Augsburger Panther; Erding Gladiators; ESV Kaufbeuren; Ravensburg Towerstars
- NHL draft: Undrafted
- Playing career: 2011–2015

Manuel Kindl (born January 3, 1993) is a German professional ice hockey defenceman. He is currently playing for Augsburger Panther in the Deutsche Eishockey Liga (DEL).

== Career statistics ==
			Regular season					Playoffs
Season	Team	League	GP	G	A	Pts	PIM	GP	G	A	Pts	PIM
2006–07	Augsburger EV U16	Schüler-BL	26	0	2	2	18	—	—	—	—	—
2007–08	Augsburger EV U16	Schüler-BL	34	15	16	31	99	—	—	—	—	—
2007–08	Augsburger EV U18	Jugend-BL	3	0	1	1	0	—	—	—	—	—
2008–09	Augsburger EV U18	Jugend-BL	18	6	7	13	41	—	—	—	—	—
2008–09	ESV Kaufbeuren U18	Jugend-BL	14	2	5	7	6	—	—	—	—	—
2009–10	EV Landshut U18	DNL	32	1	7	8	20	8	1	2	3	18
2010–11	EV Landshut U18	DNL	33	2	4	6	59	9	1	1	2	12
2011–12	Augsburger EV U20	Junioren-BL	19	3	7	10	61	—	—	—	—	—
2011–12	Augsburger Panther	DEL	8	0	0	0	0	—	—	—	—	—
2011–12	Erding Gladiators	Germany3	12	0	1	1	12	—	—	—	—	—
2012–13	Augsburger EV U20	Junioren-BL	10	11	4	15	12	—	—	—	—	—
2012–13	Augsburger Panther	DEL	3	0	0	0	0	—	—	—	—	—
2012–13	ESV Kaufbeuren	Germany2	11	0	1	1	6	—	—	—	—	—
2012–13	Erding Gladiators	Germany3	29	1	8	9	46	—	—	—	—	—
2013–14	Augsburger Panther	DEL	25	0	1	1	0	—	—	—	—	—
2013–14	Ravensburg Towerstars	DEL2	23	2	3	5	10	7	0	0	0	2
2014–15	Ravensburg Towerstars	DEL2	14	1	2	3	6	—	—	—	—	—
DEL totals			36	0	1	1	0	—	—	—	—	—
DEL2 totals			37	3	5	8	16	7	0	0	0	2
Germany2 totals			11	0	1	1	6	—	—	—	—	—
Germany3 totals			41	1	9	10	58	—	—	—	—	—
