= Theme (computing) =

Preset package containing graphical appearance and functionality details

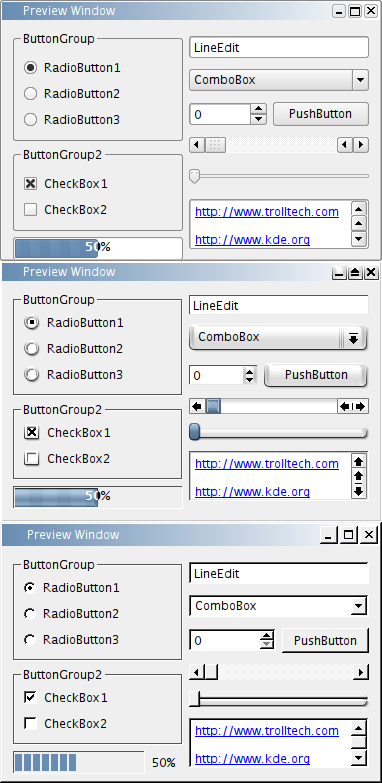
The same GUI (using Qt) with three different themes

In computing, a theme is a preset package containing graphical appearance and functionality details. A theme usually comprises a set of shapes and colors for the graphical control elements, the window decoration and the window. Themes are used to customize the look and feel of a piece of computer software or of an operating system.

Also known as a skin (or visual style in Windows XP) it is a custom graphical appearance preset package achieved by the use of a graphical user interface (GUI) that can be applied to specific computer software, operating system, and websites to suit the purpose, topic, or tastes of different users. As such, a skin can completely change the look and feel and navigation interface of a piece of application software or operating system.

Software that is capable of having a skin applied is referred to as being skinnable, and the process of writing or applying such a skin is known as skinning. Applying a skin changes a piece of software's look and feel—some skins merely make the program more aesthetically pleasing, but others can rearrange elements of the interface, potentially making the program easier to use.

== Use ==
Themes are often used to change the look and feel of a wide range of things at once, which makes them much less granular than allowing the user to set each option individually. For example, users might want the window-borders from a particular theme, but installing it would also alter the desktop background.

One method for dealing with this is to allow the user to select which parts of the theme they want to load; for example in Windows 98, users could load the background and screensaver from a theme, but leave the icons and sounds untouched.

== Themed systems ==
=== Operating systems ===
Microsoft Windows
Microsoft Windows first supported themes in a separately released add-on package for Windows 95 called Microsoft Plus! for Windows 95. Themes were later included in Windows 98 as a built-in optional component; the Microsoft Plus! 98 add-on package also includes support for themes as well. These operating systems, as well as Windows Me, came with themes that customized desktop backgrounds, icons, user interface colors, Windows sounds and mouse cursors. Windows XP expanded Windows theming support by adding visual styles and allowing each theme to specify one. Third-party software such as WindowBlinds, and Desktop Architect enhance theming capabilities. Support for custom themes can also be added by patching system files using third-party utilities, such as UltraUXThemePatcher and SecureUxTheme, which is not endorsed by Microsoft.
Linux
Linux operating systems may support themes depending on their window managers and desktop environments. IceWM uses themes to customize its taskbar, window borders, and time format. Window Maker can store colors for icons, menus, and window-borders in a theme, but this is independent of the wallpaper settings. GNOME and KDE use two independent sets of themes: one to alter the appearance of user interface elements (such as buttons, scroll bars or list elements), and another theme to customize the appearance of windows (such as, window borders and title bars).
macOS
macOS does not natively support themes. Third-party apps such as Kaleidoscope and ShapeShifter may add this.
Android
Although Android does not support themes, the forked CyanogenMod and its successor LineageOS have native theme support. The CM theme engine is in turn used on many other forked Android ROMs, such as Paranoid Android.

=== Apps ===
Firefox and Google Chrome either support or supported a form of theme. Firefox (and its sibling Thunderbird) supports themes either through lightweight themes (formerly Personas). Google Chrome version 3.0 or later allows themes to alter the appearance of the browser. Internet Explorer 5 and its immediate successor allowed the background picture of their toolbars to be customized.

The most popular skins are for instant messaging clients, media center, and media player software, such as Trillian and Winamp, due to the association with fun that such programs try to encourage.

== Standard interface ==
Some platforms support changing the standard interface, including most using the X Window System. For those that do not, programs can add the functionality, like WindowBlinds for Microsoft Windows and ShapeShifter for macOS.

== Websites ==
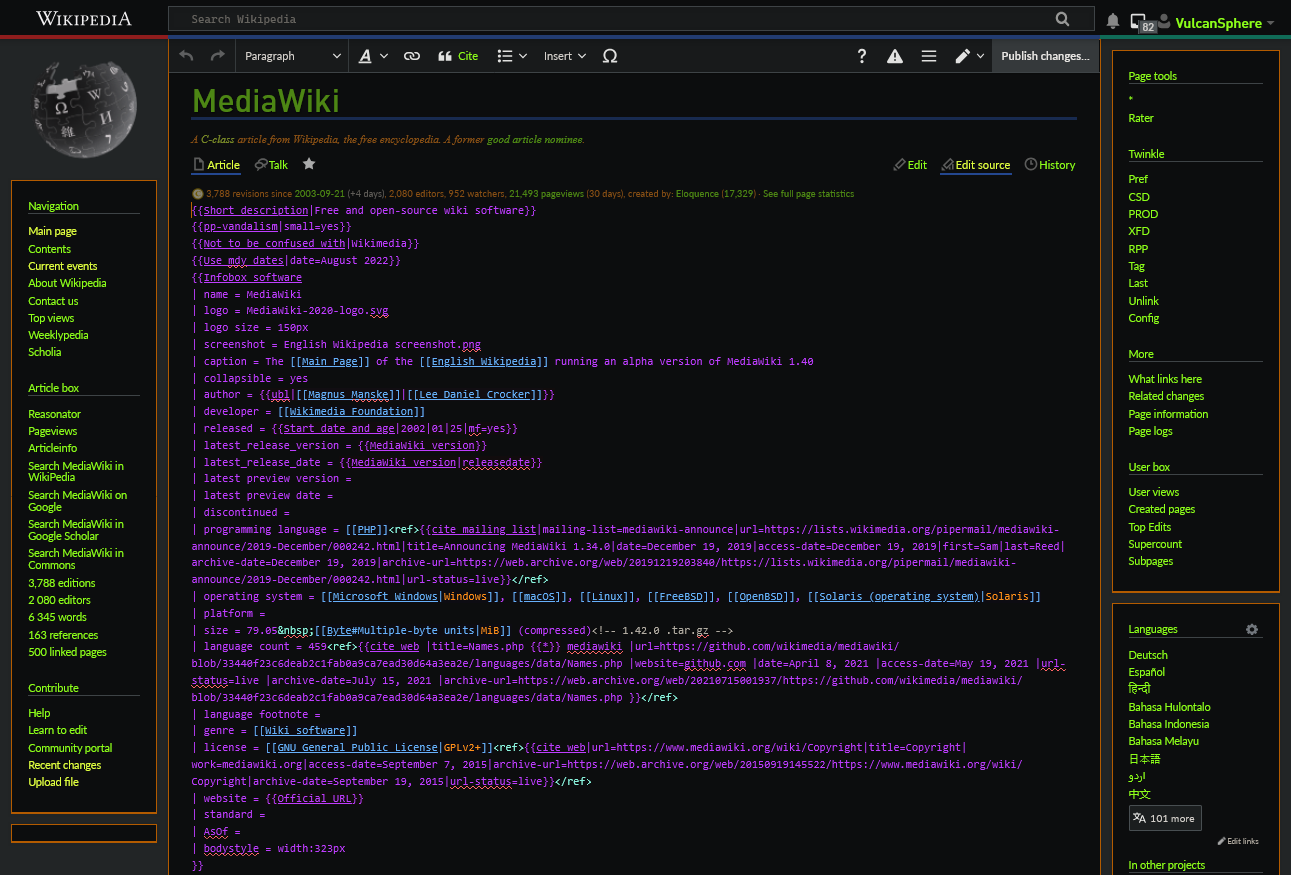
Example of customized theme (Timeless) in Wikipedia; MediaWiki is skinnable

Many websites are skinnable, particularly those that provide social capabilities. Some sites provide skins that make primarily cosmetic changes, while some—such as H2G2—offer skins that make major changes to page layout. As with standalone software interfaces, this is facilitated by the underlying technology of the website—XML and XSLT, for instance, facilitate major changes of layout, while CSS can easily produce different visual styles.

== See also ==
- Aqua (user interface)
- Computer wallpaper
- Industrial design
- Look and feel
- User interface design
- Windows Aero
- Windows XP visual styles
