= Windows XP visual styles =

Customization of the user interface of Windows XP

Visual styles are a set of graphical appearance preset packages designed by Microsoft for Windows XP and later. They have a greater emphasis on the graphical appeal of the operating system compared to the "Windows Classic" style used in previous versions of Windows since Windows 95 with saturated colors and bitmaps on windows and occasionally featuring rounded corners. Since Windows XP, themes also include the choice of visual styles as well.

Visual styles are compatible with all editions of Windows XP except for the Starter edition. "Luna" is preinstalled on most editions of Windows XP including Windows XP Home Edition and Professional, while "Royale" is preinstalled on Windows XP Media Center Edition 2005 and Windows XP Tablet PC Edition 2005. "Embedded" is preinstalled on Windows Embedded Standard 2009 and Windows Embedded POSReady 2009. "Luna" and "Royale" in particular are the codenames for the two visual styles offered in Windows XP.

Microsoft has released additional visual styles for download in addition to the preinstalled ones such as "Zune". Some visual styles acted as placeholders for the official visual styles that were only used in beta versions of Windows such as "Watercolor", "Mallard", "Plex", "Slate" and "Jade". Third parties and individuals have also released their own visual styles but these require modifications of core Windows components that Microsoft does not officially endorse.

The visual styles API was substantially expanded in Windows Vista and later; nevertheless the API remained heavily under-documented.

== Development history ==
=== Early to late 2000: Watercolor, Mallard, Candy ===
The concept of visual styles in Microsoft Windows was first conceived on February 22, 2000 during the development of Windows XP (then codenamed "Whistler" at the time) with an internal spreadsheet discussing the inclusion of both consumer and professional oriented visual styles in the operating system with plans to complete both visual styles by April 28, 2000.

The first theme created to take advantage of the new visual style API was Watercolor (originally named Professional and internally named Business). Designed to improve on the look-and-feel of Windows used since Windows 95, it had a conservative design with blue accenting throughout the interface and intended to complement a consumer-oriented theme that only concept images exist. Watercolor officially appeared in the first public preview build of Whistler known as build 2250 on July 13, 2000 however the files for an early incomplete version of the visual style from build 2250 were discovered in build 2223 and can be accessed in said build via modifications or third-party utilities. It was given a slight update in build 2257. Watercolor was never intended to be included in the final product; it was mainly used as a placeholder for the time being until the final visual styles were revealed.

The second theme to use the visual style API was Mallard (officially known as Sample Test Visual Style), which acted as the consumer-oriented counterpart to Watercolor. It made use of various elements of the visual style API such as the taskbar and title bar using various design elements including a half semicircle on the left-hand side of the title bar and came with two color variations, Chartreuse Mongoose and Blue Lagoon (internally named Paler), which sets it apart from Watercolor which only has one color variation. Mallard officially debuted in build 2410 during the time of the development of Beta 2. According to Microsoft developer Raymond Chen, Mallard was created by Microsoft as a decoy for testers to use until they were ready to showcase their new finalized visual style, Luna.

Concepts for a consumer-oriented theme were shown off at Microsoft Technical Briefing 2000 in September 2000 which showcased an early version of the visual style that would eventually become Mallard. The concept also featured a brand-new set of icons that were developed in conjunction with the new visual styles intended to replace the existing ones that were in use up to Windows 2000 and Windows Me. The icons were designed by The Iconfactory who were contracted by Microsoft to create icons for the operating system that had more detail than the pixelated sprite-based icons found in early Windows versions. This early concept was featured briefly on the Taskbar Properties applet in build 2257 before officially debuting in build 2410.

Alongside Watercolor and Mallard, there was another theme that used the visual style API in its early stages of development known as Candy that looked similar to the Aqua interface of Apple's then-relatively new Mac OS X (now macOS) operating system. It was created as a test to make use of some of the new features of the visual style API but was never known to be included in any other builds of Whistler and only resurfaced when the source code for both Windows XP Service Pack 1 and Windows Server 2003 leaked in September 2020. Candy resembled a partial reskin of Watercolor with some elements making use of the Aqua aesthetic. The metadata found within the files of the visual styles themselves suggests that it was developed between builds 2250 and 2257.

=== Late 2000 to August 2001: Luna ===
By late 2000, it became apparent that the two placeholder visual styles were starting to look out of place with the rest of the operating system and Microsoft decided to replace them with the ones that would remain consistent with the look-and-feel of the operating system while also wanting a brand-new visual style that looked fresh and appealing to all users. With these plans in place, work on the new default visual style began.

At that time, Microsoft contracted design firm Frog Design who were known for designing products for companies such as Apple Inc. and NeXT in the 1980s as well as Packard Bell and Acer in the 1990s to create new visual identities for the operating system such as a brand-new logo and visual style as well as helping out with designing the new skins for Windows Media Player version 8 (as well as version 7 briefly). Initial plans called for two distinct visual styles aimed at consumers and professionals (codenamed "Luna" and "Mercury" respectively) to replace both Mallard and Watercolor. According to concept images, Luna would have used colorful rubber-like details resembling that of early versions of Mallard (aka Sample Test Visual Style) while Mercury would have used monochromatic steel-like details with design elements reminiscent of that of the final version of Luna; the two visual styles were designed to have a green-colored Start button that would become a staple in the final version of Luna. Both would also have corresponding Windows Media Player skin designs made (which presumably evolved to become "Windows XP" for Luna and "Windows Classic" for Mercury respectively). Ultimately due to time constraints, Luna was the only one to be finalized outside of the concept stage while Mercury never fully realized.

The first concept images of Luna during the initial concept phase were created in late 2000 (Note: Often misattributed as 1999 in most sources, which was most likely referring to the date modified metadata in the sample files provided in the concept image) sometime after the release of Beta 1 (build 2296). This early concept, known by some as "Luna Concept", showcased the very early progress of the visual style with no rounded corners, a taskbar with a blue gradient, Explorer windows with orange gradients on the top and bottom, a red close window button and a green-colored start button that was a different shape. Several elements from this concept such as the blue window borders and taskbar, the red close button, and a green start button would become a part of the final version of Luna. It also featured new icon designs designed by The Iconfactory reminiscent of the ones used in the final product which were included in build 2410 to replace several icons from Windows 2000 and prior. While most developers privately worked on Luna, Watercolor and Mallard remained as the default visual styles in most publicly released preview builds of Whistler from late 2000 and early 2001 as Microsoft was not ready to introduce the new visual style to the operating system yet.

At the Consumer Electronics Show on January 6, 2001, Microsoft dedicated a portion of its event to Whistler and demonstrated a refined yet still very early version of Luna to the public for the very first time. This iteration of Luna, known informally as "Luna Beta", showcased the progress made after its initial conception in late 2000 and looked similar to what would eventually be included in later builds such as build 2428 albeit with some differences such as the use of a larger font for window captions, a different design for the Start menu with a blue-white gradient background for the righthand pane, a blue Log Off button and the Start button still using the then-current Windows logo (the build was compiled a few weeks prior to the logo change in build 2428). The version of Whistler shown at the event was build 2415 (lab06_N) compiled on January 2, 2001 that also featured the iconic Bliss wallpaper that was later included in build 2419 alongside other wallpapers that would be available in the final product.

Screenshot of Windows XP with an early version of Luna informally known as "Luna Beta"

On February 13, 2001, Microsoft officially unveiled an improved version of the Luna visual style during a press event at EMP Museum in Seattle and was released to testers on that same day with build 2428, completely replacing the placeholder Watercolor and Mallard visual styles. This iteration of Luna, also known as "Luna Beta", began to look closer to its final appearance with some differences such as a brighter scrollbar, differently-shaped taskbar buttons and a Start button that has some shine added in. The build also featured Red Moon Desert as the default wallpaper instead of Bliss from build 2415 or the Whistler default wallpaper from builds 2410 to 2419, which remained in later builds up to build 2465. Prior to officially debuting in build 2428, it appeared as early as build 2423 compiled on January 21, 2001 that was featured in the Beta 2 Core Technology Guide. The assets for the now-scrapped visual styles remained intact in the source code tree for Windows XP up to Service Pack 1 and Windows Server 2003 however and were subsequently discovered in 2020 when the source code for both operating systems was leaked.

Build 2465 was the first available build of Whistler to identify itself as Windows XP and was released to testers on April 26, 2001. This build brought Luna closer to its finalized look such as the removal of the shine from the Start button as well as different scrollbar and taskbar button designs but lacking the additional color variations found in the final version. The build also had Bliss set as the default wallpaper for the first time instead of Red Moon Desert due to testers comparing the latter to buttocks.

At the Windows XP Expert Zone briefing in May 2001, Luna was updated to add two additional color variations for Luna codenamed "Homestead" and "Metallic" (later renamed to "Olive Green" and "Silver" respectively); the build shown at the briefing was a Lab06_N compile of build 2474. These additional color variations were officially released to testers on June 6, 2001 with build 2481. The finalized version of Luna as well as the visual style API arrived on August 24, 2001 with build 2600 of Windows XP to manufacturers and on October 25, 2001 for the general public. The assets of an early version of Luna from build 2428 also remained in the source code tree after the visual style was redesigned and was subsequently leaked in September 2020 alongside the Watercolor, Mallard and Candy visual styles.

=== 2002–2006: Plex, Slate, Jade, Aero ===
During the development of Windows Vista (aka "Longhorn"), three visual styles were developed: Plex, Slate, and Jade. Plex appeared as early as build 3683 and was included up until build 4042 (main) where it was replaced with Slate in build 4042 (Lab06_N) and Jade appeared in Longhorn Server (soon to be known as Windows Server 2008) build 4066. These acted as placeholders for Aero which debuted in the post-reset build 5048 with continuous updates until build 6000 of Windows Vista which was released on November 8, 2006 for manufacturers and on January 30, 2007 for the general public. They also worked in conjunction with the Desktop Window Manager (DWM) compositing engine that allowed for greater emphasis on transparency effects and animation. Pre-reset builds of Longhorn also included Aero-like glass borders and effects only accessible via modifications that can be applied on top of the existing Plex, Slate, and Jade (and possibly Luna) visual styles.

=== 2004–2009: Royale, Royale Noir, Zune, Embedded ===
Concurrent with the development of Windows Vista, another visual style was developed for a new version of Windows XP Media Center Edition called Royale (officially known as the Media Center style), which was a glossy and brighter-colored version of Luna that debuted on October 12, 2004 with the release of Windows XP Media Center Edition 2005. There was also another color variation of Royale known as Royale Noir which was being worked on before it was scrapped and then later leaked online shortly afterwards. Weeks later, Microsoft released a variation of Royale known as Zune to accompany the release of its Zune portable music player and was similar to Royale Noir in that aspect. For the last two embedded versions of Windows XP known as Windows Embedded Standard 2009 and Windows Embedded POSReady 2009, another variation of Royale was introduced known as Embedded that was a dark-blue colored variant of the Zune visual style that Microsoft had previously offered.

== List of visual styles ==
The following is a list of visual styles offered in Windows XP. Visual styles offered in later versions of Windows such as Windows Vista are not included on this list.

=== Luna ===
Luna, blue (default)

Luna, olive green

Luna, silver

"Luna" (the Moon in Latin and various other languages) is the codename for the default visual style of Windows XP. Officially known as "Windows XP style", it is available in three color schemes: blue (default), olive green (codenamed "Homestead") and silver (codenamed "Metallic"). It features a colorful plastic-styled interface with rounded corners in the title bars as well as a green-colored Start button. The close button is colored red while the minimize, maximize/restore buttons are colored in the same blue color as the visual style. Other elements such as the radio buttons and scrollbars are also skinned with the same aesthetic. The typeface used for the title bars is Trebuchet MS while most elements used Tahoma (and in some cases MS Sans Serif) as its typeface.

Critics who did not like the visual style nicknamed it as a "Fisher-Price interface" among others due to most people at the time of Windows XP's release perceiving it as "childish".

Luna was retained as a placeholder visual style in all pre-reset Windows Vista (Longhorn) builds alongside the Plex, Slate and Jade visual styles (see below) as well as the very early "Omega-13" post-reset builds 3790, 5000, 5001 and early Beta 1 builds 5048 and 5059. It was completely removed from all post-reset builds beginning as early as build 5098 after the unveiling of Aero in build 5048.

A variation of Luna also appeared in the Windows CE line of embedded operating systems beginning with Windows CE 5.0.

=== Windows Classic ===
Classic

"Windows Classic" is the name of a visual style that utilizes the original user interface design of Windows used since Windows 95. Officially titled "Windows Classic style", it uses a beveled design with sharp edges and 3D-styled widgets for control elements. It supports custom colors, sizes, and font styles for the various elements of the Windows user interface that can be saved in a preset known as a "color scheme". Unlike other visual styles, it is built-in to the operating system kernel and as such does not use nor take advantage of the visual style API first introduced in Windows XP.

Compared to other visual styles, it is less CPU-intensive and offers better performance (which is also why it is used by default on Windows Server 2003 through 2008 R2 for the same reason) and supports greater color and font customization options. It is also used when the theme service is disabled as well as in other certain scenarios such as Win32 console windows or when booting the system into Safe mode. Classic style widgets are also used for applications that are not theming-aware even though theming is enabled.

The default typeface for the classic style is MS Sans Serif in all releases of the Windows 9x series and Windows NT 4.0 (as well as being the typeface used in the "Windows Classic" scheme) which was changed to Tahoma in Windows 2000 onwards for the majority of the elements. The title bars typically used a boldface variant of the default typefaces. Marlett was designed to be used as the typeface for scalable elements of the user interface such as the minimize, maximize, restore, and close buttons.

The classic style has remained relatively unchanged since its introduction in 1995, though it has received some minor changes: Windows 98 added support for customizable two-tone color gradients in the title bars while the default color scheme was changed in Windows 2000; the previous one was kept as one of the many built-in color schemes. In Windows XP up to Windows 7, it became a secondary option as visual styles such as Luna were introduced.

Windows XP and prior includes 22 preset color schemes for the classic style, four of them being optimized for the visually impaired. (Note: These are known as "High Contrast #1", "High Contrast #2", "High Contrast White" and "High Contrast Black" respectively.) "Windows Standard" was the default color scheme of Windows 2000 and Windows Me (albeit with different fonts in the latter) while a slightly darker variant of the Standard scheme with different fonts called "Windows Classic" was the default color scheme of Windows 98 (albeit with a dark blue desktop background instead of green, which was done during Windows 2000's development). These two color schemes (as well as the four "high contrast" schemes) later appeared on Windows Vista and Windows 7 although the latter removes the Windows 98 "Classic" scheme and renames the Windows 2000 "Standard" scheme to "Windows Classic". Other schemes appeared in previous versions of Windows.

The classic style was removed as an option from Windows Server 2012 and Windows 8 onwards, however it still exists internally for backward compatibility purposes.

=== Royale ===
Windows XP Media Center Edition 2005 introduced the Royale visual style with two variations of it being produced, including one scrapped variation that was eventually leaked.

==== Royale (Energy Blue) ====
Royale (Energy Blue)

"Royale" (also known as Energy Blue and "Media Center style") is a visual style originally designed for Windows XP Media Center Edition 2005 which released in October 2004. It presents a relucent, vivid and faux-reflective color scheme with intense blue and green colors using a glossy finish. It is accompanied by a new wallpaper inspired by Windows XP's iconic Bliss wallpaper informally called "Energy Bliss". It was later made available as an optional download in December 2004 to all users of Windows XP via the Experience Pack.

Microsoft New Zealand used to offer the Royale visual style and the wallpapers for the New Zealand theme for download for all editions of XP through Windows Genuine Advantage on its website on April 7, 2005, but as of 2019 it is no longer available. Despite this, the pages for the downloads have been archived. Due to the freeware nature of these packages, it has also been available on other software download websites at one time such as Softpedia. The Royale or New Zealand theme package also contains a wallpaper that is different from the one found in Windows XP Media Center Edition 2005.

Microsoft also released a Windows Media Player visualization and skin at one point via the Experience Pack for Tablet PC and was available for free, however it can only be installed on Windows XP Tablet PC Edition devices for which it was licensed.

==== Royale Noir ====
Royale Noir

"Royale Noir" is an unreleased visual style that looks like a darkened version of Royale with a blackish and bluish to purple tint. It also has a black Start button that changes to green when the mouse hovers over it. As Royale Noir was leaked and not finalized by Microsoft, it has been noted for some imperfections such as an excessively dark-colored title bar when the window is inactive.

==== Zune ====
Zune

A few weeks after Royale Noir was leaked, "Zune" was officially released in a theme package to accompany the release of Microsoft's new Zune media player. In terms of style, Zune resembles Royale and Royale Noir, particularly the latter. It displays a brown to light shadow style and is the first publicly released visual style for Windows XP to include a differently colored Start button from the standard green color, being colored orange in the Zune visual style.

==== Embedded ====
Embedded

Windows Embedded Standard 2009 and Windows Embedded POSReady 2009 came with a dedicated visual style called "Embedded" that is similar to Royale, Royale Noir and Zune but with a mix of dark blue colors. It was the second publicly released Windows XP visual style to use a differently colored Start button from the normal green color used in most Windows XP visual styles, this time in the same dark blue color as the visual style itself.

== Placeholder styles ==
Early builds of Windows since Windows XP included visual styles that were intended to be placeholders to the final visual styles that were developed internally before they were publicly released. This list covers visual styles that appeared in early builds of Windows XP (also known as Whistler) as well as visual styles from Longhorn (which later became Windows Vista).

=== Whistler ===
The following is a list of visual styles that were developed during the development of Windows XP (codenamed Whistler) which primarily served as placeholders for Luna that debuted to the public at CES 2001 and released to testers in build 2428.

==== Watercolor ====
Watercolor

"Watercolor" (internally named "Business" and codenamed "Professional") is a placeholder visual style used in early pre-release builds of Windows XP from builds 2250 (Note: Watercolor first appeared in an inaccessible form in build 2223 as an early unfinished form of the one that appeared in build 2250.) to 2419 and later appeared (in source code form) in the leaked source code of Windows XP in September 2020. Officially known as "Watercolor button style", it was the first visual style developed by Microsoft to take advantage of the visual style API during its early stages of development. Intended to improve upon the visual elements of Windows Classic, it primarily uses a blue and white style design and retains certain elements of Windows Classic such as the sharp edges and similar window proportions. It also uses a red color scheme for inactive windows, which was originally gray in builds prior to build 2257 and later changed to dark blue as early as build 2264.

==== Mallard ====
Blue Lagoon

Chartreuse Mongoose

"Mallard" is the internal name for a placeholder visual style designed by Microsoft as a decoy to show to the public during the development of Beta 2 while designers privately worked on Luna. It appeared in pre-release Windows XP builds from builds 2410 (Note: An early version of Mallard appeared as a concept image in the Start Menu Properties applet in build 2257 before officially appearing in build 2410.) to 2419 and later appeared (in source code form) in the leaked source code of Windows XP in September 2020. Officially known as "Sample Test Visual Style", It featured two color schemes: Chartreuse Mongoose (internally named with the aforementioned name) and Blue Lagoon (internally named "Paler"), with the former using a green and orange style while the latter uses a teal and purple style. It features an orange start button with a green notification area as well as a curved half-semicircle on the left-hand side of the title bar.

==== Candy ====
Candy

"Candy" is an unreleased visual style that was found (in source code form) in the leaked source code of Windows XP in September 2020. Though no builds of Windows XP used the visual style, it was made in-between builds 2250 and 2257 according to the dates found within the metadata of the files in the visual style. Candy appears to be an imitation of Aqua, a user interface design that was used in Mac OS X from versions 10.0 to 10.6, using Aqua-like design elements for some parts of the UI such as the buttons, scroll bars, and balloon notifications. Not much is known about its purpose, however it was likely meant as a way to test the theming engine that was first available in build 2250.

According to some publicly available screenshots, Candy resembles a partially reskinned version of Watercolor from build 2250 with some UI elements modified to make use of the Aqua aesthetic; most of the visual style still retained elements of Watercolor (such as the title bars and window borders) as well as Windows Classic due to its incompleteness. The unique Start button included with this visual style contained the then-current Windows logo at the center without the word "Start" next to it on a pin-striped background with a small curved corner at the top-left; this design mimics the Apple menu which had a singular Apple logo, the curved corners are a nod to the menu bar on Classic Mac OS and early versions of Mac OS X (which had curved corners on both sides) and the pin-stripes are an obvious nod to Aqua itself.

=== Longhorn ===
The following is a list of visual styles that were developed during the development of Windows Vista (codenamed Longhorn) which primarily focuses on those that were developed during the "pre-reset" phase of development. These visual styles served as placeholders for Aero that was publicly shown in build 5048 during the "post-reset" phase of development. The Luna visual style from Windows XP was also retained as a placeholder in all pre-reset builds (up to build 4093) and some post-reset builds (up to build 5059).

==== Plex ====
"Plex" is a placeholder visual style used in Longhorn from builds 3683 to 4042 (main). It more closely resembles Luna but predominately uses a blue color throughout the interface with different shades of blue. It uses similar window proportions to Luna, including the use of rounded corners.

==== Slate ====
"Slate" is one of the two placeholder visual styles used in Longhorn prior to the development reset from builds 4042 (Lab06) to 4093. Similar to Plex, it also resembles Luna using similar window proportions but with a slate gray color scheme and also features a grey start button that changes to dark green when hovered over or clicked on.

==== Jade ====
"Jade" is one of the two placeholder visual styles used in Longhorn prior to the development reset from builds 4066 to 4093. As with the Plex and Slate visual styles, it resembles Luna using similar window proportions but with a light gray and white color scheme. It uses Segoe UI as the typeface for the user interface and also features a differently-styled start menu reminiscent of that found in Windows Vista.

== Special theme packs ==
Though they are not visual styles, some theme packages were offered for specialized products for Windows XP, many of them reusing the Luna visual style with no other changes.

=== Microsoft Plus! for Windows XP themes ===
The Microsoft Plus! for Windows XP enhancement package includes four themes using the three color variations of the Luna visual style: Aquarium, Nature, da Vinci, and Space. Aquarium uses the default (blue) Luna color scheme, Nature and da Vinci use the olive green Luna color scheme, and Space uses the silver Luna color scheme. Each theme came with its own unique set of icons, cursors, wallpapers, and screen savers.

=== Windows 20th Anniversary ===
The Japan-only limited-release Windows 20th Anniversary enhancement package released in 2005 to commemorate the 20th anniversary of Windows (1985–2005) contains a specialized theme that reuses the default (blue) Luna visual style with a unique wallpaper, sound scheme, screen saver, icons and cursors tied to the aforementioned anniversary. The included screen saver chronicles the history of Windows from 1985 to 2001, including the then-upcoming Windows Vista (which would not be released until 2007).

== Third-party visual styles ==
Windows only loads a visual style that bears a valid Microsoft digital certificate. As such, third-party visual styles can only be used if one of the Windows files called uxtheme.dll is altered to allow unsigned visual styles. Microsoft is aware of such a practice and suggests obtaining a newer revision of the patched uxtheme.dll file in case problems occur after Microsoft's own updates to the file have been applied (typically through an OS service pack).

== Application support ==
Third-party applications can be configured to work with visual styles. By default, the title bar and the window borders of Windows Forms-based applications are rendered using the user's preferred visual style, while the rest of the application's graphical user interface (GUI) is rendered in the Classic style. This is because these two different parts of the GUI are rendered using two different software libraries: the title bar and the window borders ("non-client area" or "user controls") use Windows USER, and the remaining controls ("client area" or "common controls") use version 5.8 of the Common Controls Library. Version 6.0 of the Common Controls Library contains both the user controls and the common controls, and developers may configure the application's user interface to be displayed in the user's currently-selected visual style by forcing it to be rendered using version 6.0 of the library.

== See also ==
- Windows Aero
- WinCustomize
- WindowBlinds
- Features new to Windows XP
- Theme (computing)
