= Ninite =

Package management system for Microsoft Windows

- Ninite web service
- Original authors: Patrick Swieskowski and Sascha Kuzins
- Developer: Secure By Design Inc.
- Operating system: Windows
- Type: Package manager, software repository
- License: Freemium
- Website: ninite.com

Ninite (/ˈnɪnaɪt/) is a package management system that lets users automatically install popular applications for their Windows operating system. It allows users to make a selection from a list of applications and bundles the selection into a single installer executable. It is free for personal use, while a paid version, Ninite Pro, is available for professional use. Ninite has been featured on Der Standard and PC Magazine.

== Features ==
Ninite works on Windows 7 and later. It presents the user with a list of programs and generates a custom installer executable based on the user's selection. The installer is able to install the correct application based on the computer's architecture and operating system.

== See also ==
- Web Platform Installer
- Binary repository manager
- Chocolatey
- Software repository
- NuGet
- ProGet
- Windows Package Manager
