= Windows NT 10 =

Windows NT 10 or Windows NT 10.0 may refer to:

== Mainline ==
- Windows 10
  - Original version
  - Windows 10 22H2
  - Windows 10 Mobile
- Windows 11, the latest version of Windows

== Windows Server ==
- Windows Server 2016
- Windows Server 2019
- Windows Server 2022
- Windows Server 2025, the server version for Windows 11
