= VMware Workstation =

Hosted hypervisor for Windows and Linux

VMware Workstation Pro
- Current icon of VMware Workstation Pro used since Version 15.0

- VMware Workstation Pro 25H2 virtualizing a Windows 10 machine on a Windows 10 host
- Developer: VMware
- Release: 15 May 1999
- Stable release: 26H1u1 / 3 September 2026; 2 months ago
- Written in: C, C++
- Operating system: Windows; Linux
- Platform: IA-32 (up to v10.0.7), x86-64
- Type: Hypervisor
- License: Freeware (formerly commercial software)
- Website: www.vmware.com/products/workstation-pro.html

VMware Workstation Pro (known as VMware Workstation until release of VMware Workstation 12 in 2015) is a hosted (Type 2) hypervisor that runs on x64 versions of Windows and Linux operating systems. It enables users to set up virtual machines (VMs) on a single physical machine and use them simultaneously along with the host machine. Each virtual machine can execute its own operating system, including versions of Microsoft Windows, Linux, BSD, and MS-DOS. VMware Workstation is developed and sold by VMware, which has been owned by Broadcom since November 2023. In May 2024, Workstation Pro became free of charge for personal use, with paid subscriptions available for commercial use, while the free restricted VMware Workstation Player (formerly known as VMware Player), included in Workstation, was dropped as a separate product. In November 2024, VMware Workstation was made free for commercial use, with paid subscriptions and support no longer available.

VMware Workstation supports bridging existing host network adapters and sharing physical disk drives and USB devices with a virtual machine. It can simulate disk drives; an ISO image file can be mounted as a virtual optical disc drive, and virtual hard disk drives are implemented as .vmdk files.

VMware Workstation Pro can save the state of a virtual machine (a "snapshot") at any instant. These snapshots can later be restored, effectively returning the virtual machine to the saved state, as it was and free from any post-snapshot damage to the VM.

VMware Workstation includes the ability to group multiple virtual machines in an inventory folder. The machines in such a folder can then be powered on and powered off as a single object, useful for testing complex client-server environments.

== History ==
VMware was first released on 15 May 1999.

=== Company restructuring and product development (2016) ===
VMware Workstation versions 12.0.0, 12.0.1, and 12.1.0 were released at intervals of about two months in 2015. In January 2016, the entire development team behind VMware Workstation and Fusion was disbanded and all US developers were immediately fired. The company said that "the restructuring activities will not impact the existence of any current product lines", that "roles and responsibilities associated with particular businesses will be moved to other regions and office locations", and that investment would continue "with emphasis on our growth products", but the future of Workstation and Fusion became uncertain by that point. On 24 April 2016, maintenance release 12.1.1 was released. Later in September of the same year, the company announced that "we’re very much alive and well". Consequently, on September 13, Workstation 12.5 and Fusion 8.5 were released as free upgrades which added support for Windows 10 Anniversary Update and Windows Server 2016. Since then, active development resumed.

=== Transition to freeware (2024) ===
In May 2024, VMware Workstation Pro became free for personal use, with only commercial use requiring a paid license, and free VMware Workstation Player was discontinued as unnecessary.

In November 2024, Workstation Pro became free for all users, including commercial and educational users. Technical support for Workstation by Broadcom was discontinued, with help now available only from documentation and the user forum on Broadcom's Web site.

=== Version history ===
Version	Release date	Significant changes
1.0	15 May 1999	First release
1.0.1	14 June 1999	Added support of Linux kernel 2.3.x
1.0.2	25 June 1999	
1.0.3	20 July 1999	New product logo and icons
1.1 for Linux	11 October 1999	First Linux release: Added support of Windows 2000; Added support of bidirectional parallel ports; Added support of Linux kernel 2.2.10; Improved support for raw disk file configuration via the Configuration Wizard and Editor; Improved support for upgrading Linux kernels and for uninstalling the product; Experimental support for RPM installations; Improved SMP performance in Linux kernel versions 2.2.8 and later; Improved built-in help
1.1.1 for Linux	18 October 1999	Added support of Red Hat Linux 6.1
1.1.2 for Linux	13 November 1999	Changes in the handling of virtual disks
1.0.1 for Windows	15 November 1999	
2.0	3 March 2000	Increased desktop performance; Added support of memory and power user changes in Windows 2000; Improved upgrade to new VMware Workstation releases; Limited SCSI support for disks and CD-ROM devices; Added support for suspending the virtual machine to disk; Added support for shrinking the virtual disks; Added support of floppy disk images; Added support of serial connections; Added support of sound input and improved sound output; Added support for disconnecting, modifying and editing the removable devices while the virtual machine is running; Improved support for raw disks; Experimental support of plain disks
2.0.1	19 June 2000	
2.0.2	1 August 2000	
2.0.3	2 November 2000	Improved mouse performance; Added support for wheel mouse; Added support for installation of SVGA driver in a Windows Me guest machines
2.0.4	21 May 2001	Added support of Red Hat Linux 7.1 and SUSE Linux 7.1; Increased default memory size of a Linux virtual machine to 64 MB; Added support of Pentium 4 processors; Added support for Windows 2000 hosts with CD-ROM drives configured for digital audio
3.0	11 November 2001	Added support of reading DVD discs; Added support of reading enhanced CD discs in the raw access mode
3.1	29 March 2002	Increased performance
3.1.1	9 April 2002	Increased performance
3.2	16 September 2002	
4.0	7 April 2003	Single snapshots
4.5	15 March 2004	Last version for Windows NT 4.0 on hosts
5.0	7 April 2005	Multiple snapshots; Linked clones; Teams
5.5	29 November 2005	Introduced support of Intel VT-x/AMD-V virtualization instructions, as well as x86-64 and multi-processor virtual machines
6.0	9 May 2007	Multiple monitor support; Background virtual machines; High-speed USB devices (EHCI)
6.5	23 September 2008	Final version to support CPUs without PAE; Record Replay; Unicode; Unity mode; Last version for Windows 2000 on hosts
7.0	10 October 2009	Replay Debugging (improved Record Replay)
7.1	25 May 2010	
8.0	14 September 2011	Shared Virtual Machines; Workstation 8 is the first version that requires an x64-compatible CPU.; Replay Debugging removed
9.0	23 August 2012	USB 3.0 support for Linux and Windows 8 guests; OpenGL driver for Linux guests; Improved graphics subsystem; Restricted Virtual Machines; Added support of Windows 8, Windows Server 2012 and Ubuntu 12.04
10.0	3 September 2013	Added support of Windows 8.1, Windows Server 2012 R2 and Ubuntu 13.10; VMware hardware version 10; 16 vCPUs; 8 TB disks; New virtual SATA disk controller; USB 3.0 streams support; SSD pass-through; Expiring Virtual Machines; Virtual tablet sensors; Accelerometer; Gyroscope; Compass; Ambient light sensor; User interface enhancements; Cloud Management Tools; VMware KVM; WSX 1.1
10.0.1	24 October 2013	Improved compatibility with some AMD Piledriver CPUs; Easy Install support for Windows 8.1 RTM and Windows Server 2012 R2 RTM; Fixes for certain hangs and freezes
10.0.2	17 April 2014	The compatibility and performance of USB audio and video devices with virtual machines has been improved.; Resolved an issue that prevents a USB device from being connected to Linux RHEL 5 guest operating system.; Easy installation option supports Windows 8.1 Update 1 and Windows Server 2012 R2 as a guest operating system.; openSUSE 13.1 is now supported as a host operating system.; Resolved an issue causing burning CDs with Blu-ray drives to fail while connected to the virtual machine.; Resolved an issue that caused using Microsoft Word and Excel in unity mode causes a beep.; Resolved an issue causing host application windows to be blanked out in the UAC dialog on the Linux host of the Windows 8 virtual machine.; Resolved an issue that prevented the Sound Card from being automatically added to the VM when powering on the virtual machine on a Linux host.; Resolved an issue that could cause a Windows 8.1 guest operating system to display a black screen when launching Metro style applications in the launch menu.; Resolved a hotkey conflict in the Preference dialog of the KVM mode.; Resolved a compatibility issue of GL renderer with some new Nvidia drivers.; Resolved graphics errors with for Solidworks applications.; Resolved an issue causing virtual machines imported from a physical PC to crash on startup.; Resolved an issue about shared folder when the user read and write file using two threads.; Resolved an issue that caused Linux virtual machines to see stale file contents when using shared folders.; Resolved the virtual machine performance issues when using the E1000e adapter.; Resolved an issue preventing Workstation from starting on Ubuntu 14.04.
10.0.3	1 July 2014	VMware Workstation 10.0.3 has been updated to the OPENSSL library version openssl-0.9.8za where necessary to address CVE-2014-0224, CVE-2014-0198, CVE-2010-5298, CVE-2014-3470.
10.0.4	30 October 2014	Fixes memory issue in Workstation on Microsoft Windows 8.1 and Windows Server 2012.
10.0.5	27 January 2015	Bug fixes; At power-on, a virtual machine hangs and a .dmp file is created.; The VideoReDo application does not display the video properly and parts of the application's screen are scrambled.; Copying and pasting a large file from host to guest may fail.; Memory leak in the HGFS server (for shared folders) causes VMware Tools to crash randomly with the error: Exception 0xc0000005 (access violation) has occurred.; New VMs have the same location UUID and MAC address so that the UUID and MAC address are not unique. This problem occurs with WS 9 and WS 10 VMs but not WS 7 and WS 8 VMs.; On RHEL 6.6, vmmon cannot be loaded due to incompatible kernel symbol versions. With gcc, kernel-headers, kernel-devel installed, vmmon module will be recompiled automatically.; Memory leak by the process vmtoolsd.exe when the guest NIC is disabled causes memory consumption by Workstation processes to increase over time.; When USB devices are autoconnected with a hub to a Renesas host controller, the devices are not redirected to the guest.; WS 11 license is accepted by WS 10.0.5 and future 10.0 updates.; When WS is installed on Linux in a non-default location, the Virtual Network Editor fails to run.
10.0.6	5 May 2015	Fixed a problem when uploading a virtual machine with Workstation 10.0.x to ESXi 6.0.
10.0.7	2 July 2015	Security fixes; Last version for Windows XP, Windows Server 2003, Windows Vista and Windows Server 2008 on hosts; Final version to support 32-bit Windows editions on hosts
11.0	1 December 2014	Added support of Windows 10, Ubuntu 14.10, RHEL 7, CentOS 7, Fedora 20 and Debian 7.6; VMware hardware version 11; 2 GB Video memory per VM; Connection to VMware vCloud Air
11.1	17 February 2015	Added support for VMware vCloud Air Virtual Private Cloud OnDemand; Bug fixes: A Linux guest OS booted on EFI firmware sometimes failed to respond to the keyboard and mouse if any mouse motion occurred during a short window of time during OS boot.; Outlook 2010 would occasionally crash when running in Unity mode.; You could not compact or defragment a persistent disk.; The UI sometimes crashed when a user copied and pasted a file between two Windows guests.; Rendering corruption in UI elements in Fedora 20 guests with 3D enabled.; When creating a new virtual machine with SUSE Linux Enterprise (SLE) 12, the Easy Install path was not available.
11.1.1	9 June 2015	Critical security fix for CVE-2012-0897, CVE-2015-2336, CVE-2015-2337, CVE-2015-2338, CVE-2015-2339, CVE-2015-2340, CVE-2015-2341; VMware Workstation and Horizon Client TPView.ddl and TPInt.dll incorrectly handle memory allocation. On Workstation, this may allow a guest to execute code or perform a Denial of Service on the Windows OS that runs Workstation.
11.1.2	15 June 2015	Security Issues; VMware Workstation 11.1.2 has been updated to OpenSSL library version openssl-1.0.1m.; Bug Fixes; Two interface items on the Access Control screen used the same hot-key combination.; Attempting to suspend a Windows virtual machine with the Sensor Diagnostic Tool running caused the virtual machine to become unresponsive.; Using audio conferencing software on a Windows 8 guest operating system caused a severe echo during both video and audio calls.; On the Windows 95 guest operating system, the mouse cursor jumped.; Symbolic links created within a Windows guest operating system on a Linux host did not list files under subdirectories.; Workstation did not display Regions in the VMware vCloud Air Subscription node.; Workstation could not automatically detect the Fedora 21 ISO when creating a new Fedora 21 virtual machine.; Under specific conditions, when the alipaybsm.exe file was installed on the Workstation host, network service was disrupted.; After connecting to vCloud Air from Workstation, no virtual machines were listed in the Workstation virtual machine library.; Using Easy Install for the Ubuntu 15.04 guest operating system with kernel 3.19.0-15-generic prevented you from enabling folder sharing.; Reverting to a snapshot failed following a specific set of steps.; A Windows 10 guest operating system running idly caused Workstation to crash.; Using the Easy Install option to install the Ubuntu 14.04 or Ubuntu 15.04 guest operating system failed to install VMware Tools.
12.0.0 Pro	24 August 2015	The following features have reached end of life in Workstation 12 Pro and have been removed: Unity mode on Linux guest and host operating systems; Virtual Debugger Visual Studio; Connection to the VMware vCloud Air subscription service; Added support for, amongst other things: Later operating system versions, including Windows 10; DirectX 10 and OpenGL 3.3; IPv6 NAT
12.0.1 Pro	29 October 2015	Bug fixes
12.1.0 Pro	8 December 2015	Bug fixes
12.1.1 Pro	21 April 2016	Bug fixes
12.5 Pro	13 September 2016	The announced release date of 8 September 2016 was missed due to a nasty bug; Compatible with Windows 10 Anniversary Update (v1607)
12.5.1 Pro	27 October 2016	Bug fixes, security updates for undisclosed vulnerabilities and performance improvements.
12.5.2 Pro	13 November 2016	This release of VMware Workstation 12 Pro addresses an out-of-bounds memory access vulnerability related to the drag-and-drop feature. This may allow a guest to execute code on the operating system that runs VMware Workstation 12 Pro.
12.5.3 Pro	9 March 2017	Bug fixes, security updates, and performance improvements.: Workstation Pro fails to launch on a Linux platform that uses kernel 4.9.0; Occasionally, the Workstation Pro user interface crashes in Workstation 12 Pro version 12.5 and displays an error; When you use a USB device that does not follow USB specifications in a virtual machine in USB passthrough mode, the guest becomes unusable; You cannot connect a parallel port to a virtual machine; Connecting an Active Braille device to the virtual machines fails; After users execute Active FTP in the guest operating system, the vmnat.exe process continues to use a TCP port of the host; ThinPrint technology does not work in a Windows XP guest operating system with VMware Tools 10.0.10; VMware Tools service is not started in Ubuntu 16.10 guest; You cannot use shared folders in a Red Hat Enterprise Linux 7.3 virtual machine
12.5.4 Pro	14 March 2017	This release addresses an out-of-bounds memory access vulnerability related to the drag-and-drop feature. This vulnerability might allow a guest to execute code on the operating system that runs VMware Workstation 12 Pro.
12.5.5 Pro	28 March 2017	This release of VMware Workstation Pro addresses the following issues: VMware Workstation Pro has a heap buffer overflow and uninitialized stack memory usage in SVGA. These issues might allow a guest virtual machine to execute code on the host. The Common Vulnerabilities and Exposures project (cve.mitre.org) has assigned the identifiers CVE-2017-4902 (heap issue) and CVE-2017-4903 (stack issue) to these issues.; The VMware Workstation Pro XHCI driver has uninitialized memory usage. This issue might allow a guest virtual machine to execute code on the host. The Common Vulnerabilities and Exposures project (cve.mitre.org) has assigned the identifier CVE-2017-4904 to this issue.; VMware Workstation Pro has uninitialized memory usage. This issue might lead to an information leak. The Common Vulnerabilities and Exposures project (cve.mitre.org) has assigned the identifier CVE-2017-4905 to this issue.
12.5.6 Pro	18 May 2017	This release includes the following highlights: Day 0 support of the Windows 10 Creators Update (v1703); Bug fixes and security updates
12.5.7 Pro	22 June 2017	This release of VMware Workstation Pro includes some bug fixes and security updates.
12.5.8 Pro	16 November 2017	Support added for: RHEL 7.4; Oracle Linux 7.3
12.5.9 Pro	10 January 2018	This update of VMware Workstation Pro exposes hardware support for branch target injection mitigation to VMware guests. This hardware is used by some guest operating systems to mitigate CVE-2018-5715 (also called by the name "Spectre").
14.0.0 Pro	26 September 2017	This major version release includes the following highlights: Updated to support the newest versions of Microsoft Windows 10 (including Enterprise), and Windows Server editions, as well as various Linux distributions; Updated support for the latest Intel and AMD processors and limited or no support for pre-2011 CPUs; Improved virtual firmware support, such as UEFI, and new Secure Boot support; Support for Virtualization Based Security (VBS); Improved Virtual Networking; New and improved support and controls for working with vSphere and the vCenter Server Appliance; Network latency simulator; New remote vSphere controls; Last version for Windows 8 and Windows Server 2012 on hosts
14.1.0 Pro	21 December 2017	This release delivers improved guest support of Windows 10 Fall Creators Update (v1709)
14.1.1 Pro	9 January 2018	This update of VMware Workstation Pro exposes hardware support for branch target injection mitigation to VMware guests. This hardware is used by some guest operating systems to mitigate CVE-2018-5715 (also called by the name "Spectre").
14.1.2 Pro	21 May 2018	This update delivers guest access to the SSBD feature in IA32_SPEC_CTRL.; This release delivers improved guest support of Windows 10 Spring Creators Update (v1803); Ubuntu 18.04 support as host and guest
14.1.3 Pro	14 August 2018	
14.1.4 Pro	11 September 2018	VMware Workstation Pro has an uninitialized stack memory usage vulnerability in the vmxnet3 virtual network adapter that might allow a guest to execute code on the host. The Common Vulnerabilities and Exposures project (cve.mitre.org) has assigned the identifier CVE-2018-6981 to this issue.
14.1.5 Pro	23 November 2018	VMware Workstation Pro contains an integer overflow vulnerability in the virtual network devices which may allow a guest to execute code on the host. The Common Vulnerabilities and Exposures project (cve.mitre.org) has assigned the identifier CVE-2018-6983 to this issue.
14.1.6 Pro	14 March 2019	This release of VMware Workstation Pro addresses the following issues: Workstation does not handle paths appropriately. This may allow the path to the VMX executable, on a Windows host, to be hijacked by a non-administrator leading to elevation of privilege. The Common Vulnerabilities and Exposures project (cve.mitre.org) has assigned the identifier CVE-2019-5511 to this issue.; COM classes are not handled appropriately. This may allow hijacking of COM classes used by the VMX process, on a Windows host, leading to elevation of privilege. The Common Vulnerabilities and Exposures project (cve.mitre.org) has assigned the identifier CVE-2019-5512 to this issue.
14.1.7 Pro	29 March 2019	Workstation contains an out-of-bounds read/write vulnerability and a Time-of-check Time-of-use (TOCTOU) vulnerability in the virtual USB UHCI (Universal Host Controller Interface). These issues may allow a guest to execute code on the host. The Common Vulnerabilities and Exposures project (cve.mitre.org) has assigned the identifiers CVE-2019-5518 (out-of-bounds read/write) and CVE-2019-5519 (TOCTOU) to these issues.
14.1.8 Pro	12 November 2019	This release of VMware Workstation Pro addresses the following issue: VMware Workstation Pro and Player versions 14.x and earlier failed to launch on Windows 10 1903 after Windows 10 KB updates were applied.
15.0.0 Pro	24 September 2018	This major version release includes the following highlights: Support for new Microsoft Windows 10 builds (including Enterprise) as well as various Linux distributions; 4K resolution.; DirectX 10.1.; Shared graphics memory limit increased to 3 GB.; RESTful API to automate common virtual machine tasks using standard JSON over HTTP/HTTPS.; This version adds new Hosts and Clusters view when connect to remote vSphere.; USB devices can be connected automatically to a powered on virtual machine.; SSH login to Linux virtual machine.; Guest display stretch.; Wayland protocol.; Improves performance for virtual NVMe storage.
15.0.1 Pro	9 November 2018	Support for the new versions of various Linux distributions.; Bug fixes and security updates.
15.0.2 Pro	22 November 2018	Support for new Microsoft Windows 10 builds (including Enterprise) and Windows Server 2019.; Bug fixes and security updates.
15.0.3 Pro	14 March 2019	Bug fixes and security updates.
15.0.4 Pro	29 March 2019	Bug fixes and security updates.
15.1.0 Pro	14 May 2019	Support for new guest operating systems; New Microsoft Windows 10 builds (including Enterprise); Ubuntu 19.04; RHEL 8; Fedora 30; VMware ESXi 6.7 Update 2; Guest display can be stretched for all guests running on Windows hosts.; Bug fixes and security updates
15.5.0 Pro	19 September 2019	Support for new guest operating systems; New Microsoft Windows 10 builds (including Enterprise); Debian 9.11 & 10; Oracle Linux 8.0; SUSE Linux Enterprise Server 15 SP1; FreeBSD 12.0; PhotonOS 3.0; Virtual networks with configurable MTU up to 9 000 bytes; Allows to save network settings after upgrades and to import and export network configurations; VMware Paravirtual SCSI Controllers (PVSCSI); Open Virtual Machine Tools (open-vm-tools), previously known as VMWare Tools, is made default for applicable Linux guests in this version; Bug fixes and security updates.
15.5.1 Pro	12 November 2019	Bug fixes and security updates
15.5.2 Pro	12 March 2020	Bug fixes and security updates
15.5.5 Pro	28 May 2020	VMware Workstation 15.5.5 now runs on Windows hosts with Hyper-V features (For example: virtualization based security) enabled.; Support for new guest operating systems; New Microsoft Windows 10 builds (including Enterprise); Ubuntu 20.04; Fedora 32; Bug fixes and security updates
15.5.6 Pro	9 June 2020	Bug fixes and security updates
15.5.7 Pro	19 November 2020	Bug fixes and security updates; Last version for Windows 7 and Windows Server 2008 R2 on hosts. Note: If version 16 did not drop Windows 7 support until version 16.2.5, it would not require Windows 7 users to upgrade to Windows 8 or later.
16.0 Pro	15 September 2020	This major version release includes the following highlights: Support for new guest operating systems; New Microsoft Windows 10 builds (including Enterprise); Ubuntu 20.04; Fedora 32; Debian 10.5; RHEL 8.2; CentOS 8.2; SUSE Linux Enterprise Server 15 SP2 GA; FreeBSD 11.4; VMware ESXi 7.0; DirectX 11 and OpenGL 4.1; USB 3.2 Gen 2 controller (up to 10 Gbit/s); VMs up to 32 virtual CPUs, 128 GB RAM and 8 GB VRAM; Dark Mode in Windows 10; vSphere 7.0 compatibility; VMs security enhanced by removing graphics render from vmx and running it as a separate sandbox process; Improves file transfer speeds (drag and drop, copy and paste), VMs shutdown time and virtual NVMe storage performance; Improves accessibility (compliant with WCAG 2.1 criteria); The deprecation of shared VMs and restricted VMs features; Bug fixes
16.1.0 Pro	19 November 2020	Support for new guest operating systems; New Microsoft Windows 10 builds (including Enterprise); Ubuntu 20.10; Fedora 33; RHEL 8.3; vctl kind updated to support Kubernetes IN Docker v0.9.0; Docker Machine VMware Driver (docker-machine-driver-vmware); Bug fixes
16.1.1 Pro	1 April 2021	Bug fixes; VMNet driver related security improvements
16.1.2 Pro	17 May 2021	Security updates
16.2.0 Pro	14 October 2021	Added support for Vulkan renderer on a Linux host with Intel, Nvidia, and AMD GPUs; Added partial support for Windows 11 as host or guest machines; Host GPUs that do not support DirectX feature level 11.1 are supported but deprecated; Host CPUs that do not support Mode-based Execution Control are supported but deprecated; Security updates and bug fixes
16.2.1 Pro	9 November 2021	Bug fixes
16.2.2 Pro	18 January 2022	Security updates
16.2.3 Pro	10 March 2022	Bug fixes
16.2.4 Pro	21 July 2022	Bug fixes
16.2.5 Pro	7 December 2022	Bug fixes; Last version for Windows 8.1 on hosts. Note: If version 16 did not drop Windows 7 support until this version, it would not require Windows 7 users to upgrade to Windows 8 or later.
17.0 Pro	17 November 2022	Support for new guest operating systems; New Microsoft Windows 11 builds (including Enterprise); Windows Server 2022; Ubuntu 22.04; RHEL 9; Debian 11.x; New auto-start virtual machine feature; New virtual Trusted Platform Module (TPM) 2.0; New full or fast encryption features; Support for OpenGL 4.3 and WDDM 1.2; Bug fixes
17.0.1 Pro	2 February 2023	Security updates and bug fixes
17.0.2 Pro	25 April 2023	Security updates and bug fixes
17.5 Pro	19 October 2023	Support for up to 256 NVMe devices (4 controllers and 64 devices per controller); Support for NVMe 1.3; Upgraded encryption algorithm from CBC to XTS; New VMRUN command line utility for controlling virtual machines; Support for importing or exporting virtual machines with vTPM device; Support for managing power operations of encrypted virtual machines using VMREST API; Security updates and bug fixes
17.5.1 Pro	27 February 2024	Fixed CVE-2024-22251 vulnerability
17.5.2 Pro	14 May 2024	Copyrights of program now link to Broadcom, VMware LLC's new owner; Introduced commercial and personal use subscriptions licensing model. For personal use, a product key won't be required; Workstation Player was discontinued as Workstation Pro became free for personal use; Fixed CVE-2024-22267, CVE-2024-22268, CVE-2024-22269, and CVE-2024-22270 vulnerabilities; Last version for Windows Server 2012 R2 and Windows Server 2016 on hosts
17.6 Pro	3 September 2024	Support for new guest operating systems; New Microsoft Windows 11 builds (including Enterprise); Windows Server 2025; Ubuntu 24.04; Fedora 40; New vmcli command line utility for directly interacting with the hypervisor from a Linux or macOS terminal, or the Windows command prompt; Removed features: Legacy operating systems Tools ISOs omitted from program download (still available for separate download); Bluetooth hub pass-through; Physical parallel port pass-through; Unity mode; Enhanced keyboard driver
17.6.1 Pro	10 October 2024	Bug fixes
17.6.2 Pro	17 December 2024	Bug fixes; Introduced a free licensing model for commercial, education, and personal use
17.6.3 Pro	4 March 2025	Fixed CVE-2025-22224 and CVE-2025-22226 vulnerabilities; Bug fixes
17.6.4 Pro	15 July 2025	Fixed CVE-2025-41236, CVE-2025-41237, CVE-2025-41238, and CVE-2025-41239 vulnerabilities; Fixed CVE-2025-2884 vulnerability
Pro 25H2 (25.0.0)	14 October 2025	Support for new guest operating systems; Red Hat Enterprise Linux 10; Fedora 42; SUSE Linux Enterprise 16 (Beta); OpenSUSE Leap 16.0 (RC); Debian 13; Oracle Linux 10; VMware ESX 9.0; Support for new host operating systems; Red Hat Enterprise Linux 10; Fedora Linux 42; openSUSE Leap 16.0 (RC); SUSE Linux 16 (Beta); Debian 13; USB 3.2 Gen 2×2 controller (up to 20 gbit/s); Update hardware compatibility to version v22; Support for Hyper-V/WHP detection; New dictTool command line utility for examining and modifying VMware configuration files
25H2u1	26 February 2026	Re-enabled the Check for updates option; Fixed CVE-2026-22715, CVE-2026-22716, CVE-2026-22717, and CVE-2026-22722 vulnerabilities
26H1	14 May 2026	VMWare Workstation has become a fully 64-bit application: all the included binaries are now 64-bit; Virtual machines now store and display time stamps and can be sorted by last used; VM notes can be displayed in tabs; New hosts and guests support (refer to release notes)
26H1u1	3 September 2026	Automated Secure Boot Platform Key remediation; Resolves CVE-2026-59346 and CVE-2026-59347

== Host OS support ==
Current operating systems compatibility matrix
Operating system	Workstation release
Windows 11	16.2 and later
Windows Server 2025	17.6 and later
Windows Server 2022	17.0 and later
Windows Server 2019	15.5 and later
Windows 10 October 2020 Update (v20H2) and up	16.0 and later
Linux distributions	Varies

Legacy operating systems compatibility matrix
Operating system	Workstation release
Windows 10 May 2020 Update (v2004)	15.5.5 and later
Windows 10 November 2019 Update (v1909)	14.1.8–17.6.4
Windows 10 May 2019 Update (v1903)	15.0–17.6.4
Windows 10 October 2018 Update (v1809)	14.0–17.6.4
Windows 10 April 2018 Update (v1803)	14.0–15.5
Windows 10 Creators Update (v1703) / Fall Creators Update (v1709)	15.0–15.5
Windows 10 Anniversary Update (v1607)	12.5–14.0
Windows 10 RTM and November Update (v1511)	11.0–14.0
Windows 8.1	10.0–16.2
Windows 8	9.0–14.0
Windows 7	7.1–15.5
Windows Vista	6.0–10.0.7
Windows XP	3.0–10.0.7
Windows 2000	2.0–6.5
Windows NT 4.0	1.0–4.5
Windows Server 2016	14.0–17.5
Windows Server 2012 R2	10.0–17.5
Windows Server 2012	9.0–14.0
Windows Server 2008 R2	8.0–15.5
Windows Server 2008	6.0–10.0.7
Windows Server 2003 R2	6.0–10.0.7
Windows Server 2003	4.0–10.0.7

== Variants ==
There used to be freeware-based version of VMware Workstation with a limited feature set. This version was at first known as VMware Player until VMware Player v7 (released at the same time as Workstation 11). In 2015 the two packages were combined as VMware Workstation 12, with a free VMware Workstation Player version which, on purchase of a player license key granted commercial use along with commercial support, while the purchase of a pro license key became the higher specification VMware Workstation Pro (which also included commercial support). VMware Workstation Player, like VMware Player before it, was free of charge for non-commercial use, or for distribution or other use by written agreement. VMware Workstation Player was discontinued in 2024 due to redundancy after VMware Workstation Pro was made free for personal use. Before discontinuing VMware Workstation Player in 2024, VMware's website used to list the differences between VMware Workstation Player and Pro.

== VMware Tools ==
VMware Tools, a package with drivers and other software available for the various guest operating systems VMware products support, installs in guest operating systems to add functionality. Tools is updated from time to time, with v13.0.5.0 on 26 September 2025. It has several components, including the following:

- Drivers for emulated hardware:
  - VESA-compliant graphics for the guest machine to access high screen resolutions and/or special window effects such as Windows Aero/Desktop Window Manager
  - Network drivers for the vmxnet2 and vmxnet3 NIC
  - Ensoniq AudioPCI audio
  - Mouse integration
- Support of shared folders and drag-and-drop file transfer between host and guest. This functionality is described as HGFS (Host Guest File System), and may be disabled by default for security; it may be enabled by changes to the .VMX configuration file
- Clipboard sharing between host and guest
- Time-synchronization capabilities (guest synchronizes with host machine's clock)
- Support for Unity, dropped for Linux from v12 and for Windows from v17.6, a feature that allowed seamless integration of applications with the host desktop by hiding the monitor of the Virtual Machine and drawing the windows of applications running in the virtual machine on the host.

== Third-party resources ==
=== Ready-to-use virtual machines ===
Many ready-made virtual machines (VMs) which run on VMware Workstation Player, VMware Workstation Pro, and other virtualization software are available with software for specific purposes ready-installed, either for purchase or free of charge. As one among many examples, there are free Linux-based "browser appliances" with the Firefox or other browser installed which can be used for safe Web browsing; if infected or damaged the VM can be discarded and replaced by a clean copy. Or the appliance can be configured to automatically reset itself after each use so that no changes, including personal information, modified files, damage, etc. are stored. VMs distributed legally only have freely distributable operating systems, as operating systems on VMs must be licensed; ready-to-use Microsoft Windows VMs, in particular, are not distributed, except for evaluation versions.

=== Other tools ===
- PowerWF - Provides a visual representation of VMware VIX scripts, converting them into workflows, or converting workflows into Powershell cmdlets and modules. VIX is VMware's addition to Microsoft's Powershell for automation of the VMware Player.

== See also ==
- Comparison of platform virtualization software
- OS-level virtualization
- VirtualBox
- VMware Fusion
- VMware Workstation Player
- x86 virtualization
