= Microsoft WebMatrix =

Web development software

- Microsoft WebMatrix 3.0
- Developer: Microsoft
- Final release: 3.0 (v7.1.1932.0) / 12 October 2013; 12 years ago
- Operating system: Windows 7 SP1 and later
- Platform: IA-32; .NET Framework
- Size: 17.1 MB
- Available in: English, Austrian, Belgian, Chinese, French, German, Hungarian, Japanese, Korean, Netherlands, Polish, Russian, Spanish, Turkish
- Type: HTML editor and website builder
- License: Freeware
- Website: www.microsoft.com/web/webmatrix/

Microsoft WebMatrix is a discontinued cloud-connected website builder and HTML editor for Windows, geared towards web development. WebMatrix enables developers to build websites using built-in templates or popular open-source applications, with full support for ASP.NET, PHP, Node.js and HTML5. Microsoft developed WebMatrix for the purpose of providing web developers with coding, customization, and publishing capabilities all in one place.

== History ==
WebMatrix is a successor of ASP.NET Web Matrix, which was released in 2003 and later discontinued.

In 2011, WebMatrix was released to support the large number of open source content management systems and to provide a lightweight web development environment for PHP and the new, simplified ASP.NET web pages. It focused on a clean, simple user interface allowing web developers to build websites from scratch or by customizing open-source web content management systems such as Orchard, DotNetNuke, Umbraco, Joomla!, Drupal and WordPress.

From 2011 to 2012, WebMatrix 2 Beta and RC releases added support for Node.js, mobile simulators, additional website templates, and support publishing to Microsoft Azure web sites. On September 6, 2012, the official release of WebMatrix 2 went public. The release of WebMatrix 3 was made available on May 1, 2013. Unlike WebMatrix 2, WebMatrix 3 requires Windows 7 or later.

In 2016, Microsoft announced the discontinuation of WebMatrix in favour of Visual Studio Code with formal support ending on November 1, 2017.

== Features ==
- Simplified creation, publishing, and synchronization of companion cloud websites
- Integration with source control systems including Git and Team Foundation Server
- Code completion and syntax highlighting for HTML5, CSS3, JavaScript and TypeScript
- Editing for server-side languages ASP.NET, PHP and Node.js
- Support for jQuery, jQuery Mobile, Less and Sass
- Mobile simulators
- Database manager for MySQL, Microsoft SQL Server and SQL CE
- Deployment tools for files and database
- Deployment to either shared hosting, dedicated servers or Microsoft Azure
- Publishing websites using FTP, FTPS and Web Deploy (an IIS feature for publishing websites)
- Built-in search engine optimization and performance reports
- Remote and offline editing
- Downloading remote sites for local editing
- Database migration from SQL Server Compact 4.0 database to SQL Server Express or SQL Server
- Extensibility through plug-ins

== See also ==
- Visual Studio Code
