= Windows 10 Server =

Windows 10 Server could refer to:

- Windows Server 2016
- Windows Server 2019
- Windows Server 2022
