= DNN =

DNN may refer to:

- Digital News Network, a defunct digital radio news service in the United Kingdom
- DNN Corporation, a software company founded by the creators of DotNetNuke
  - DNN (software), formerly DotNetNuke, a web content management system developed by DNN Corporation
- Dinosaur News Network, a parody of Cable News Network on Dinosaurs (TV series)
- Dalton Municipal Airport in Dalton, Georgia
- Deep neural network, a type of artificial neural network
