= Mobile simulation =

Mobile simulation may refer to:

- M-learning or mobile learning, games and simulations for learning on mobile devices
- Mobile simulator, computer software that emulates a mobile device
