= The Linux Schools Project =

- The Linux Schools Project
- Developer: Paul Sharrad
- OS family: Linux (Unix-like)
- Working state: Current
- Source model: Open source
- Kernel type: Monolithic
- License: Various
- Official website: linuxschools.com

The Linux Schools Project (formerly Karoshi, which can be translated literally as "death from overwork" in Japanese) is an operating system designed for schools. It is a Linux distribution based on Ubuntu (operating system). The project maintains two custom distributions, with one designed for use on servers and the other for use with the server version on client machines. The server distribution is the official Karoshi, while the client is known as Karoshi Client.

TLSP uses prepackaged GUI scripts in order to simplify the install and configuration process for inexperienced users.

== History ==
TLSP was originally developed using Red Hat, early in the 2000s, with the aim of making Linux adoption easier for schools in the UK. Linux, at the time, was considered difficult to use in educational environments where computing expertise mainly came from teachers who were not dedicated IT staff.

With version 5.1.x, TLSP moved to the PCLinuxOS platform - but has since adopted Ubuntu in its place. The current production version of TLSP is 12.1.

== Features ==
TLSP is downloadable from their homepage. The installation steps require an initial install of Ubuntu, which the Live CD prompts to initiate. Following the machine reboot after installation of Ubuntu, the install of the TLSP system is initiated automatically.

=== Educational ===
TLSP is primarily aimed at educational environments, but is also suitable for use in a Small to Medium Enterprise (SME) business environment. The included systems are suitable for use as file and print, email, web and e-learning servers. By leveraging these technologies, it is possible to administer a complete network using the integrated web tools and by using some form of remote desktop technology.

TLSP also provides an Exam Account feature that allows teachers through the Web Management interface to create dedicated exam accounts and upload exam files to each account. Completed work can be downloaded when the students have completed their exam.

=== Server distribution ===
==== Primary Domain Controller capability ====
The TLSP system is a scalable single or multi server system, comprising many features. Chief among these are the ability to act as a Primary Domain Controller in a Windows network. TLSP uses built in Samba and LDAP servers to store user, group and computer information, and emulates a Microsoft Windows NT 4.0 server system using these technologies, providing computer and user authentication, along with file and print services on the local network. TLSP creates a standard Windows domain for the local network, and names it linuxgrid.

==== KiXtart ====
TLSP uses KiXtart scripts to set up Windows XP clients on the domain, providing mandatory profiles to most users on the system. Roaming profiles can be used, but are not recommended, due to the heavy network overhead involved. Using mandatory profiles and folder redirection to mapped file shares on the server, allows every user to store his own files in his "My Documents" folder.

==== Servers ====
TLSP includes the Moodle e-learning package, and several website content management systems, including Joomla! and Website Baker. eGroupWare and SquirrelMail are built into the system, allowing for full calendar and email facilities. These can be installed on a standalone machine in the DMZ section, thus providing increased security on systems that are directly exposed to the internet.

==== WPKG ====
Particularly interesting is the inclusion of WPKG, which enables the remote installation of software on Windows clients. By using a machine profile stored on the server, it is possible to install software packages, hotfixes, and security updates in the background. It is also very helpful in terms of creating machine profiles, allowing a 'blank' Windows XP machine to be updated automatically to a particular WPKG profile, once the machine is added to the domain.

This type of technology can be compared to the group policy mechanism in Windows Server 2003, particularly from a machine administration perspective. It is by no means a replacement for group policy, but is a step in the right direction.

=== Client distribution ===
The first version of Karoshi Client was based on PCLinuxOS. Further upgrades to the system as a whole led to the client using a modified version of Ubuntu 10.04 LTS with a GUI similar to the Microsoft Windows interface. The interface was designed to be fast, as to run well on older hardware. In June 2012 work was started on Karoshi Client version 2, which would have an interface closer to Gnome 2 than Windows. Development of the client release was given to Robin McCorkell - a student of Dover Grammar School for Boys. On 21 July 2012 Karoshi Client 2 was uploaded to SourceForge.net.

==== Technical ====
Karoshi Client contains many applications which were deemed necessary for school work. Media production software (including music production, image manipulation, and video editing software) are included, along with programming tools and visualization software. Many IDEs are installed by default, mainly set for use with Java, but also supporting C/C++ programming or other languages. The C++ compiler and standard libraries are installed by default, along with the Boost libraries, ncurses and Mesa libraries for OpenGL programming. The Java Development Kit is installed, and integrated with the installed IDEs.

Xfce is used as the desktop manager, with a customized theme and panel layout. The developer ported the Clearlooks GTK2 theme to GTK3 so that Gnome 3 applications like gEdit would display correctly. The panel layout is similar to the Gnome 2 environment. Compositing effects have been enabled by default for the environment. The interface settings are locked down in the Xfce configuration files due to the need for suitability in a school environment, where children may try and play with the settings. The KDE greeter for LightDM is used for the log in screen, due to problems with KDM and Ubiquity.

This version of Karoshi Client is more integrated with the server distribution than the previous client releases, with most of the custom configuration files pulled down from a primary domain controller on boot up. A server patch that added the correct files for the client was released on 23 July 2012.

Kerberos is supported on the server since version 9.0.0, providing single sign on to all services provided by the Karoshi distribution. This integration allows Single Sign-On using kerberos tickets for authentication to email, printing, internet, and moodle.

== Limitations ==
It used to be difficult to integrate TLSP into an existing Windows network, without changing the address space to the standard one that is used by the TLSP system.

This was only a limitation in early versions and no longer applies.
