= Wpkg =

Wpkg may refer to:

- wpkg (Windows Packager), a software that is a Debian dpkg look-alike, developed up to 2015
- WPKG (software), an unrelated packager for Windows, developed up to 2014
- WPKG, American radio station from Wisconsin
