= Scoop Package Manager =

Command-line installer for Microsoft Windows

Scoop
- Release: 8 March 2022; 4 years ago
- Stable release: 0.5.3 / 12 August 2025; 12 months ago
- Written in: PowerShell, C#, XML
- Operating system: Windows 7 or later
- Platform: IA-32, x64
- Type: Package manager
- License: Unlicense, MIT License
- Website: scoop.sh
- Repository: github.com/ScoopInstaller/Scoop

Scoop is a command-line package manager for Microsoft Windows, used to download and update programs and applications, as well as their dependencies.

Scoop installs apps in the current user's home directory, so it does not require admin permissions to install or update software. This allows Scoop to avoid User Account Control prompts.

According to programming books, scoop is often recommended for installing web development tools and other software development tools.

== See also ==
- AppImage
- Chocolatey
- ClickOnce
- Listaller
- Windows Package Manager (winget)
