= Web Platform Installer =

Discontinued installer software

- Developer: Microsoft
- Release: January 21, 2009
- Final release: 5.0 / February 14, 2013; 13 years ago
- Operating system: Windows XP SP3 and later Windows Server 2003 SP2 and later
- Platform: x86-64, IA-32
- Size: 4.5 MB
- Available in: 14 languages
- List of languages English, German, Japanese, French, Spanish, Italian, Korean, Chinese Traditional, Chinese Simplified, Czech, Polish, Portuguese-Brazil, Russian, Turkish
- Type: Package management system
- License: Freeware
- Website: www.microsoft.com/web/downloads/platform.aspx

Web Platform Installer (Web PI) is a discontinued freeware, closed-source package management system developed by Microsoft that installs non-commercial development tools and their dependencies that are part of Microsoft Web Platform, including:

- Internet Information Services
- WebMatrix
- Visual Web Developer Express Edition
- Microsoft SQL Server Express Edition
- .NET Framework
- Silverlight Tools for Visual Studio
- PHP
- WordPress
- Umbraco
- Drupal
- Joomla!
- Orchard

Microsoft announced Web PI in October 2008 and offered for download a release candidate build of the software the following month. The company released version 1.0 of Web PI on January 21, 2009. The ability to install third-party software was added in version 2.0, released September 24, 2009. As of July 2015, Web PI can install 82 titles. Web PI 2.0's options are populated dynamically at runtime from Microsoft's servers, allowing installation options to be updated without the need to download newer versions of the Web PI itself.

In 2010, Microsoft announced Web PI 3 which includes WebMatrix, a new set of integrated tools for web development. Web PI 3 installs additional tools for web development including IIS Developer Express, SQL Server Compact and DotNetNuke.

Web PI features an offline mode where products can be downloaded to a local cache on a machine where internet access is available and then use these cached files on a different machine later. However, Web PI is still not usable in environments where Internet connectivity and local administrator privileges are mutually exclusive (i.e. a given process can either authenticate through a transparent proxy, or can have High or System integrity level, but not both).

InfoWorld writer Serdar Yegulalp called Web PI most comparable with Softaculous's AMPPS and wrote that, while not fully compatible with the WAMP model on account of lacking support for installing Apache HTTP Server, it came close by "help[ing] accelerate Web development on Windows platforms by deploying many non-Microsoft stack elements" such as PHP, Perl, and MySQL. He liked its ability to work as a staging server but took umbrage with its inability to locally edit remotely published sites not themselves deployed from Web PI.

The Microsoft Web Platform Installer (WebPI) has been retired since July 1, 2022.

== See also ==
- Solution stack: set of software subsystems or components needed to create a complete platform
- Windows Package Manager: an open-source package manager for Windows 10 and Windows 11
