= ASP.NET Web Matrix =

ASP.NET Web Matrix, whose name was the inspiration for WebMatrix, was released in 2003 and later discontinued by Microsoft in favor of Web Developer Express, a free version of Visual Studio's web development functionality; Visual Studio is Microsoft's flagship IDE for all aspects of Visual Basic and C# coding, including ASP.NET development.

What had changed by 2010 was the existence of a number of open source projects offering PHP and ASP.NET site templates and Content Management Systems that could be used by non-programmers to build and maintain rich web applications. Microsoft WebMatrix provided a development environment to help facilitate these emerging styles of website creation.

== History ==
=== ASP.NET Web Matrix (2003) ===
The original ASP.NET Web Matrix was a free tool released by Microsoft for the rapid development of web applications intending to run on Microsoft servers supporting ASP.NET server-side technologies. It was a managed application written in C#, Microsoft's principal programming language.

ASP.NET Web Matrix grew out of a pet project started by Nikhil Kothari. Originally conceived as a test bed for working with ASP.NET controls in a designer environment, the ASP.NET team saw a number of benefits for a tool of this type, including the creation of an Integrated Development Environment that could act as a lightweight alternative to Visual Studio. The project was developed into a product (originally code-named "Saturn") that was released in the summer of 2002 as a free download on the www.asp.net Web site, without official support (only community support) and with only word-of-mouth marketing. The original release supported only Microsoft SQL Server, which was bundled with Web Matrix in the form of MSDE, a desktop version of the database engine. A subsequent release of Web Matrix ("Web Matrix Reloaded") in June 2003 included support for Microsoft Access .mdb files, which simplified deployment.

Web Matrix included a number of features that made it an appealing alternative to Visual Studio 2003. It was a comparatively small download, fast and easy to install, and it was specific to Web applications. This set it apart from Visual Studio, avoiding many of the complexities required to support different tools, languages, and development environments in Visual Studio. It used a folder-based model, rather than the project model used in Visual Studio, and did not require design-time compilation into a single deployable .dll. Instead, developers could deploy the source code for their ASP.NET pages and rely on ASP.NET to dynamically compile the pages on first request.

ASP.NET Web Matrix included a small Web-server tool ("Cassini") that ran on the local computer, enabling the developer to test ASP.NET Web pages without requiring Internet Information Services. This feature made it appealing to developers who could not run IIS due to corporate policy or because they did not have a version of Microsoft Windows that supported IIS. It also included FTP support, rather than requiring FrontPage Server Extensions (FPSE). This feature made it a practical development tool for hobbyists and students who could develop and test on their own computer, and then deploy their files to a hosted server. Best of all, it was free.

Many of these features were incorporated into Visual Studio 2005, and the Web Matrix style of web application development became the default. The success of the Web Matrix project, both in terms of features and in the appeal to the community of a free IDE with a limited feature set, persuaded the Microsoft Visual Studio team to release Visual Studio Express Editions 2005 – incorporating a slimmed-down Visual Web Developer for web development, and similar Express versions of Visual Basic, C#, and SQL Server.

=== Visual Studio Express Editions ===
While ASP.NET Web Matrix provided a number of innovations, it lacked important features required by professional web developers, such as IntelliSense, integration with the debugger, an integrated compiler for developing class libraries and support for the ASP.NET code-behind page model. When the innovations made by ASP.NET Web Matrix made their way into the Visual Studio product line, and in particular the free, slimmed-down although fully functional Visual Web Developer 2005, there was no further need for ASP.NET Web Matrix.

With new versions of Visual Studio released in 2008 and 2010, Microsoft continued its policy of making available to student and freelance programmers and web developers a free, slimmed-down version of Visual Studio called Visual Studio Express Editions, and in particular Visual Web Developer Express Edition.
