= DNN Corporation =

DNN Corp.
- Type: Private
- Founded: San Mateo, California (2006)
- Headquarters: 401 Congress Ave, Suite 2650 Austin, TX 78701, USA
- Key people: Andy Tryba, CEO
- Products: DNN Platform; Evoq Content; Evoq Engage; DNN Store
- Number of employees: 10
- Website: dnnsoftware.com

DNN Corp. (formerly DotNetNuke Corporation) is the steward of the DotNetNuke (DNN) open source project, a web content management system (CMS) and application development framework for building web sites and web applications on Microsoft .NET. Organizations use DNN to develop and deploy interactive and dynamic web sites, intranets, extranets and web applications.

== Company overview ==
DNN Corp. was founded in 2006 by the leadership of the DotNetNuke open source project - Shaun Walker, Nik Kalyani, Joe Brinkman and Scott Willhite. In November 2008 the company raised Series A round financing from Sierra Ventures and August Capital. The company is headquartered in San Mateo, California. In February 2009 the company launched the first commercial version of the DotNetNuke framework, the DotNetNuke Professional Edition, for critical web applications.

In August 2017, DNN Corp was acquired by ESW Capital.

The company's main product is the DNN (formally DotNetNuke) Web Content Management Platform which is available in both a free Community (Platform) and subscription-based Professional and Enterprise Editions (marketed as Evoq). DNN Corp. also operates the DNN Store where users purchase third-party modules and skins for the DNN CMS.
