= Chocolatey =

Windows package manager software

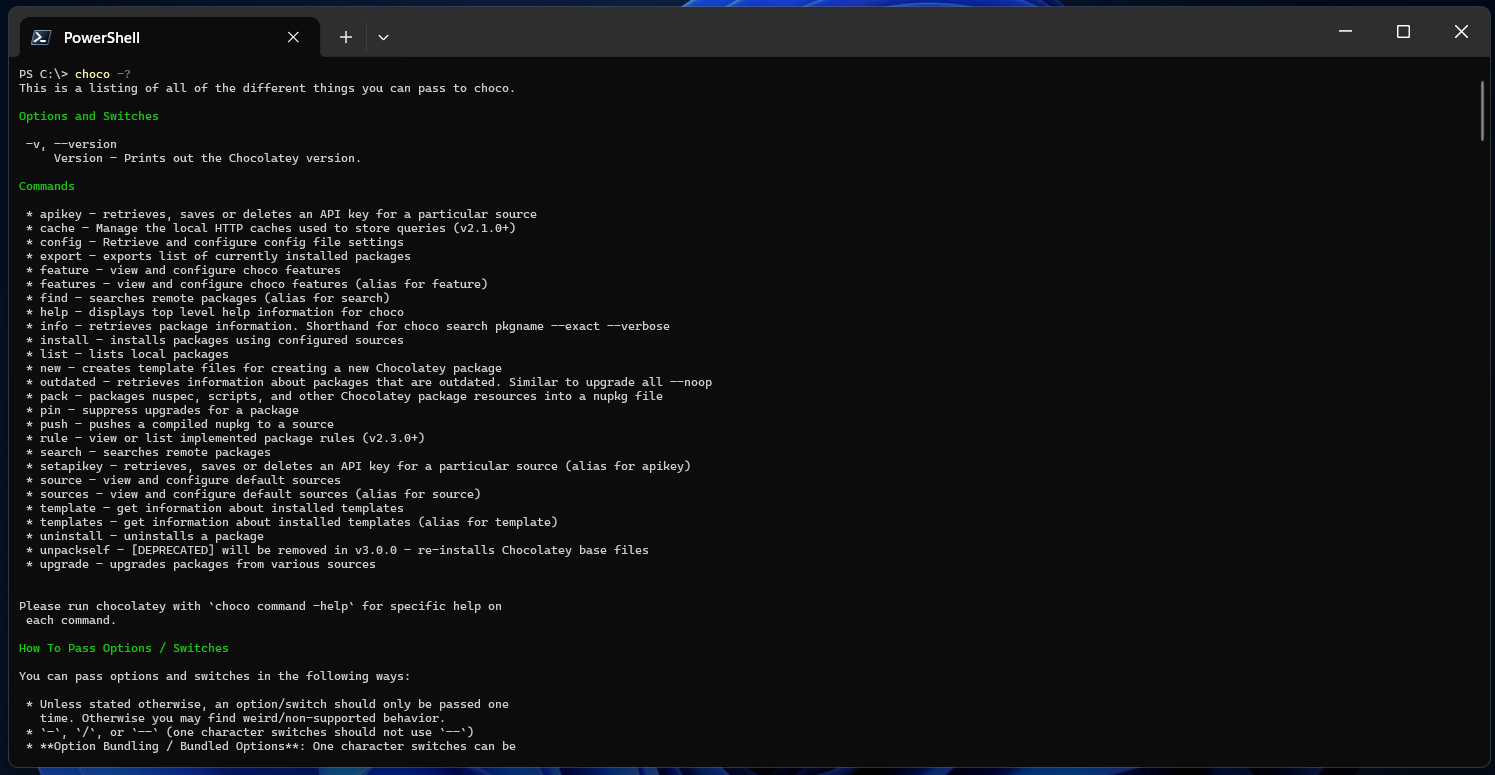
- Screenshot Chocolatey running in the Windows Terminal
- Original authors: Chocolatey Software, Inc.
- Developers: Chocolatey Software, Inc.
- Release: 23 March 2011; 15 years ago
- Stable release: 2.7.4 / 19 August 2026; 41 days ago
- Preview release: 2.3.0-beta-20240528 / 29 May 2024; 2 years ago
- Written in: C#, XML, shell script
- Operating system: Windows 7 / Windows Server 2008R2 and later
- Type: Package management system
- License: Apache License 2.0
- Website: chocolatey.org
- Repository: github.com/chocolatey/choco

Chocolatey is a machine-level, command-line package manager and installer for software on Microsoft Windows. It uses the NuGet packaging infrastructure and Windows PowerShell to simplify the process of downloading and installing software.

The name is an extension on a pun of NuGet (from "nougat") "because everyone loves Chocolatey nougat".

The choco command is used to start the Chocolatey command-line package manager.

== Compatible package manager ==
In April 2014, Microsoft debuted OneGet (renamed PackageManagement on March 20, 2015) alongside PowerShell 5. It is a free and open-source package-provider manager, which provides a way to integrate other package managers into PowerShell. OneGet was pre-configured to browse the Chocolatey repository.

== See also ==
- Windows Package Manager
- Scoop
