= Windows Server 2025 =

Eleventh major version of Windows Server, released in 2024

- Version of the Windows NT operating system

- Screenshot of Windows Server 2025
- Developer: Microsoft
- Written in: C, C++, C#, Assembly
- OS family: Windows Server
- Working state: Current
- Source model: Closed-source
- Released to manufacturing: May 27, 2024; 2 years ago
- General availability: November 1, 2024; 2 years ago
- Latest release: 24H2 (10.0.26100.33828) (November 13, 2026; 5 days ago) [±]
- Marketing target: Business
- Available in: 110 languages
- Update method: Windows Server Update Services
- Package manager: Windows Package Manager
- Supported platforms: x86-64 AArch64 (only available for Microsoft Azure and some OEMs)
- Kernel type: Hybrid (Windows NT kernel)
- Default user interface: Windows Shell (graphical)
- License: Commercial proprietary software
- Preceded by: Windows Server 2022 (2021)
- Succeeded by: Windows Server 2028 (2027)
- Official website: Windows Server 2025

Support status
- Mainstream support until November 13, 2029; Extended support until November 14, 2034

Windows Server 2025 is the fourteenth and current major version of the Windows NT operating system produced by Microsoft to be released under the Windows Server brand name. It was released on November 1, 2024, and is based on Windows 11, version 24H2.

Windows Server 2025 is the first version of Windows Server to be based on Windows 11, which was released over three years earlier.

Microsoft announced that the sudo command feature would be available for Windows Server 2025. However, with the release of Windows 11 build 26052, it later confirmed that the feature would be available exclusively on Windows 11. Nevertheless, some users found sudo command traces on the preview. Microsoft stated that it was added by accident and would be disabled in future releases. Upgrade paths to Windows Server 2025 are available for Windows Server 2012 R2, Windows Server 2016, Windows Server 2019, and Windows Server 2022.

== History ==
Windows Server 2025 was revealed to be the name of the next major release of Windows Server with the release of the first Windows Server preview build (version 26040) to users in the Windows Insider program on January 26, 2024. It reached general availability on November 1, 2024.

== Features ==
Windows Server 2025 has the following features:

- Server Flighting, the ability to upgrade to a new release via Windows Update
- Pay-as-you-go subscription
- SMB over QUIC
- Hotpatching
- Windows Package Manager
- Windows Terminal as default command-line shell

== Hardware requirements ==
Minimum hardware requirements for Windows Server 2025
| Hardware | Minimum requirement |
|---|---|
| CPU | x86-64-v2 processor with support for PAE, NX, POPCNT, SSE2, SSE4.2, CMPXCHG16b, PrefetchW and LAHF/SAHF (Intel Nehalem or AMD Bulldozer or newer) |
| RAM | 512 MB for Server Core or 2 GB for Server with Desktop Experience |
| Hard disk space | At least 32 GB free space |
| Display | 1024 x 768 pixels resolution (only required for certain features) |
| Network | A wireless adapter that supports 802.11, or; An Ethernet adapter capable of at least 1 Gbit per second throughput, or; NIC card with a minimum bandwidth of 1 Gbit |
| Firmware | UEFI 2.3.1c-based system and firmware that supports secure boot (only required for certain features) |
| Security | Trusted Platform Module 2.0 (only required for certain features) |
