= ProGet =

Package management system

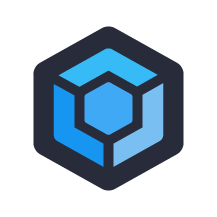
- Developer: Inedo
- Stable release: 24.0.27 / 2025
- Operating system: Microsoft Windows and Linux
- Type: Package management system
- License: Freemium
- Website: inedo.com/proget

ProGet is a package management system, designed by the Inedo software company. It allows users to host and manage personal or enterprise-wide packages, applications, and components. It was originally designed as a private NuGet (the package manager for the Microsoft development platform) manager and symbol and source server. Beginning in 2015, ProGet has expanded support, added enterprise grade features, and is targeted to fit into a DevOps methodology. Enterprises utilize ProGet to “package applications and components” with the aim of ensuring software is built only once, and deployed consistently across environments.

The research and advisory company Gartner lists ProGet as a tool aligned to the “Preprod” section of a DevOps toolchain being used to “hold/stage the software ready for release”.

ProGet currently supports a growing list of package managers, including NuGet, Chocolatey, Bower, npm, Maven, Dart/Flutter, Rust (Cargo), PowerShell, RubyGems, Helm for Kubernetes, Debian, Python, and Visual Studio Extensions (.vsix).

ProGet also supports Docker containers, Jenkins build artifacts (through a plugin) and vulnerability scanning.

It is possible to monitor feeds from the ProGet interface; these features are also available to be managed from a number of the clients with which it interfaces.

== Features ==
Some of ProGet's main features include:

- Feed aggregation
- Connected feed filtering by package or license
- Build/deployment server integration
- Multiple feed support
- Symbol & source server, avoiding the need for a separate symbol server for packages that contain program databases (PDBs)
- Users-based security
- Integrated LDAP
- Automatic failover
- Multi-site replication
- Cloud storage, supporting Amazon S3 and Azure Blob package stores
- Deployment records
- Package promotion
- Jenkins CI support
- Vulnerability scanning
- OSS License Filtering
- Publish directly from Visual Studio
- Webhooks
