= NuGet =

.NET package manager

- Developers: Microsoft, .NET Foundation
- Release: 5 October 2010; 15 years ago
- Stable release: 6.11 / 13 August 2024; 2 years ago
- Preview release: 6.12.0.83 / 24 August 2024; 2 years ago
- Written in: C#
- Platform: .NET Framework
- Type: Package management system
- License: Apache License 2.0
- Website: www.nuget.org
- Repository: github.com/NuGet/Home

NuGet (pronounced "New Get") is a package manager, primarily used for packaging and distributing software written using .NET and the .NET Framework. The Outercurve Foundation initially created it under the name NuPack. Since its introduction in 2010, NuGet has evolved into a larger ecosystem of tools and services, including a free and open-source client application, hosted package servers, and software deployment tools.

== Overview ==
A NuGet package is a single ZIP file that bears a .nupack or .nupkg filename extension and contains .NET assemblies and their needed files, with a manifest file describing its contents. Developers may create these packages with the NuGet client app and publish them in private or public repositories.

NuGet was initially distributed as a Visual Studio extension. Starting with Visual Studio 2012, both Visual Studio and Visual Studio for Mac can natively utilise NuGet packages. NuGet's client, nuget.exe is a free and open-source, command-line app that can both create and consume packages. MSBuild and .NET Core SDK (dotnet.exe) can use it when it is present. NuGet is also integrated with JetBrains Rider.

It supports multiple programming languages, including:

- .NET Framework packages
- .NET packages
- Native packages written in C++, with package creation aided by CoApp

== See also ==
- Chocolatey
- ProGet
- Software repository
- Web Platform Installer
- WinOps
- Windows Package Manager
