= Mobile simulator =

A mobile simulator is a software application for a personal computer which creates a virtual machine version of a mobile device, such as a mobile phone, iPhone, other smartphone, or calculator, on the computer. This may sometimes also be termed an emulator.

The mobile simulator allows the user to use features and run applications on the virtual mobile on their computer as though it was the actual mobile device.

A mobile simulator lets you test a website and determine how well it performs on various types of mobile devices. A good simulator tests mobile content quickly on multiple browsers and emulates several device profiles simultaneously. This allows analysis of mobile content in real-time, locate errors in code, view rendering in an environment that simulates the mobile browser, and optimize the site for performance.

Mobile simulators may be developed using programming languages such as Java, .NET and JavaScript.

== See also ==
- Mobile application development
- Simulation for general information on simulation
- Web-based emulation
- Motion simulator - a mobile simulator in the entertainment world
