= Windows Server 2022 =

Major release of Windows Server, released in 2021

- Version of the Windows NT operating system

- Screenshot of Windows Server 2022
- Developer: Microsoft
- Written in: C, C++, Rust, C#, Assembly language
- OS family: Windows Server
- Working state: Current
- Source model: Closed source
- Released to manufacturing: May 24, 2021; 5 years ago
- General availability: August 18, 2021; 5 years ago
- Latest release: 21H2 (10.0.20348.5761) (October 13, 2026; 0 days ago) [±]
- Marketing target: Business
- Available in: 110 languages
- Update method: Windows Update; Windows Server Update Services; SCCM
- Package manager: Windows Package Manager
- Supported platforms: x86-64
- Kernel type: Hybrid (Windows NT kernel)
- Default user interface: Windows Shell
- License: Commercial proprietary software
- Preceded by: Windows Server 2019 (2018)
- Succeeded by: Windows Server 2025 (2024)
- Official website: Windows Server 2022 (archived at Wayback Machine)

Support status
- Mainstream support ended on October 13, 2026; Extended support until October 14, 2031

Windows Server 2022 is the thirteenth major version of the Windows NT operating system produced by Microsoft to be released under the Windows Server brand name. It was announced at Microsoft's Ignite event from March 2–4, 2021. It was released on August 18, 2021, almost 3 years after Windows Server 2019, and a few months before the Windows 11 operating system.

Windows Server 2022 is based on the "Iron" codebase, unlike Windows 10 21H2, which is based on the "Vibranium" codebase like its predecessor 20H2; this renders the updates between Windows 10 21H2 and Windows Server 2022 incompatible. Like its predecessor, Windows Server 2019, it requires x64 processors.

It was succeeded by Windows Server 2025 on November 1, 2024.

== History ==
Microsoft announced Windows Server 2022 on February 22, 2021, scheduled for March 2. On March 3, Microsoft started distributing preview builds on Windows Update. Windows Server 2022 reached general availability on August 18, 2021.

Microsoft Edge, showing Wikipedia on Windows Server 2022 (The Windows taskbar is visible at the bottom.)

== Features ==
Windows Server 2022 has the following features:

=== Security ===
- Enhanced boot-time security via TPM 2.0 and System Guard (a component of Microsoft Defender Antivirus)
- Credential Guard
- Hypervisor-protected Code Integrity (HVCI)
- UEFI Secure Boot
- Protection against malicious attacks via the DMA path
- DNS over HTTPS
- AES-256 encryption of SMB traffic
- SMB over QUIC instead of TCP

=== Storage ===
- Storage Migration Service (SMS)
- Compression of SMB traffic

=== Cloud ===
- Azure hybrid capabilities

=== Software ===
- Microsoft Edge

== Editions ==
Essentials

- Only available through Microsoft OEM partners
- Intended for small businesses
- Supports a maximum of 25 users and 50 devices
- Requires no client access licenses (CALs)

Standard

- Intended for physical or weak VCC environments
- Only two virtual machines and one Hyper-V host are deemed usable.

Datacenter

- Intended for highly virtualized data centers and cloud environments

Azure Datacenter

- Designed for the Microsoft Azure platform

== Hardware requirements ==
Minimum hardware requirements for Windows Server 2022
Hardware	Minimum requirement
CPU	1.4 GHz x86-64 processor
RAM	512 MB for Server Core or 2 GB for Server with Desktop Experience
Hard disk space	At least 32 GB free space
Display	1024 x 768 pixels resolution (only required for certain features)
Network	A wireless adapter that supports DW802.11, or; An Ethernet adapter capable of at least 1 Gbit per second throughput, or; NIC card with a minimum bandwidth of 1 Gbit
Firmware	UEFI 2.3.1c-based system and firmware that supports secure boot (only required for certain features)
Security	Trusted Platform Module 2.0 (only required for certain features)
