= Windows Server 2019 =

Version of Windows Server, released in 2018

- Version of the Windows NT operating system

- Screenshot of Windows Server 2019 with Desktop Experience
- Developer: Microsoft
- Written in: C, C++, C#, Assembly language
- OS family: Windows Server
- Working state: Current
- Source model: Closed source
- Released to manufacturing: September 18, 2018; 7 years ago
- General availability: October 2, 2018; 7 years ago
- Latest release: 1809 (10.0.17763.8755) (May 12, 2026; 20 days ago) [±]
- Marketing target: Business
- Available in: 110 languages
- Update method: Windows Update
- Package manager: Windows Installer; Windows Store
- Supported platforms: x86-64
- Kernel type: Hybrid (Windows NT kernel)
- Userland: Windows Subsystem for Linux
- Default user interface: Windows shell (Graphical); Windows PowerShell (Command line)
- Preceded by: Windows Server 2016 (2016)
- Succeeded by: Windows Server 2022 (2021)
- Official website: Windows Server 2019 (archived at Wayback Machine)

Support status
- Mainstream support ended on January 9, 2024; Extended support until January 9, 2029

Windows Server 2019 is the twelfth major version of the Windows NT operating system produced by Microsoft to be released under the Windows Server brand name. It is the second version of the server operating system based on the Windows 10 platform, after Windows Server 2016. It was announced on March 20, 2018 for the first Windows Insider preview release, and was released internationally on October 2, 2018, the same release date of Windows 10 version 1809. It was succeeded by Windows Server 2022 on August 18, 2021.

Mainstream support for Windows Server 2019 ended on January 9, 2024, and extended support will end on January 9, 2029.

== Development and release ==
Windows Server 2019 was announced on March 20, 2018, and the first Windows Insider preview version was released on the same day. It was released for general availability on October 2 of the same year.

On October 6, 2018, distribution of Windows 10 version 1809 (build 17763) was paused while Microsoft investigated an issue with user data being deleted during an in-place upgrade. It affected systems where a user profile folder (e.g. Documents, Music or Pictures) had been moved to another location, but data was left in the original location. As Windows Server 2019 is based on the Windows version 1809 codebase, it too was removed from distribution at the time, but was re-released on November 13, 2018. The software product life cycle for Server 2019 was reset in accordance with the new release date.

== Editions ==
Windows Server 2019 consists of the following editions:

- Windows Server 2019 Essentials - intended for companies up to and including 25 employees, memory-limited.
- Windows Server 2019 Standard - intended for companies with more than 25 employees or more than 1 server to separate server roles.
- Windows Server 2019 Datacenter - is mainly used for placing multiple virtual machines on a physical host.

== Features ==
Windows Server 2019 has the following new features:

- Container services:
  - Support for Kubernetes (stable; v1.14)
  - Support for Tigera Calico (an open-source networking and security solution for containers, virtual machines, and native host-based workloads)
  - Linux containers on Windows
- Storage:
  - Storage Spaces Direct
  - Storage Migration Service
  - Storage Replica
  - System Insights
- Security:
  - Shielded Virtual Machines
  - Improved Windows Defender Advanced Threat Protection (ATP)
- Administration:
  - Windows Admin Center
  - SetupDiag (a diagnostic tool that can be used to obtain details about why an upgrade was unsuccessful)
  - OpenSSH included

=== Web browser ===
Microsoft Edge did not support Server 2019 at release. Microsoft considers Internet Explorer 11 a "compatibility layer," not a browser. Edge added support in January 2020, but Server 2019 does not install it by default. Microsoft encourages server and enterprise users to install Edge.

== See also ==
- Microsoft Servers
- Comparison of Microsoft Windows versions
- Microsoft Windows version history
- Comparison of operating systems
- List of operating systems
